= Votes at 16 =

UK political advocacy campaign

Votes at 16 Coalition
- Formation: 23 January 2003
- Type: Coalition
- Location: United Kingdom
- Members: Organisations

Votes at 16 is a campaign in the United Kingdom which argues in favour of reducing the voting age to 16 for all public elections. The campaign espouses several principles in favour of lowering the voting age.

== Votes at 16 Coalition ==
The Votes at 16 Coalition is a national group of major UK youth organisations, political parties and other supporters that campaign for 16 and 17 year olds to be able to vote in all UK public elections. The coalition is led by a steering group of active members who include the British Youth Council, the Children's Rights Alliance for England, The Co-operative Group, the National Union of Students and the Scottish Youth Parliament. This group of organisations have been campaigning on Votes at 16 for a number of years and meet regularly to plan and develop the campaign. Other member organisations of the coalition consist of the Electoral Reform Society, YMCA, the National Youth Agency and the European Youth Forum among many more.

=== Current members organisations ===
- British Youth Council
- Children's Rights Alliance for England
- National Union of Students (United Kingdom)
- Public Achievement
- Scottish Youth Parliament
- A National Voice
- Alliance Youth
- Article 12
- Association for Citizenship Teaching
- Association of Educational Psychologists
- Barnardo's
- Young Wales
- Care Leavers' Association
- Children's parliament
- Children's Rights Officers and Advocates
- Compass Youth
- Scottish National Party (Youth)
- Plaid Ifanc
- Dudley College (Students' Union)
- Edinburgh University Students' Association
- Electoral Reform Society
- Student voice
- Envision
- Epping Forest Youth Council
- European Youth Forum
- Funky Dragon
- Gateshead Youth Council
- Global Youth Justice
- The Intergenerational Foundation
- Lancaster and Morecambe College Students' Union
- Liberal Democrats (UK)
- Liberal Party (UK)
- Young Liberals (UK)
- Liberty (advocacy group)
- Local Government Information Unit
- Plaid Cymru
- NAHT Edge
- National Children's Bureau
- National Union of Students Wales
- National Union of Students Scotland
- Oldham Youth Council
- Practical Participation
- Public and Commercial Services Union
- Youth Focus North East
- Scottish Greens
- Scottish Liberal Democrats
- Scottish National Party
- Fife College Students' Association
- The Children's Society
- Co-operative Party
- National Council for Voluntary Youth Services
- Trade Union Council
- Unison (trade union)
- University of Lincoln Students' Union
- Unlock Democracy
- UpRising
- WIMPS
- Woodcraft Folk
- YMCA
- Young Advisors
- Young Greens of England and Wales
- Young Labour (UK)
- Lewisham Young Mayor
- Young Scot
- National Youth Agency
- Christians on the Left

== Parliamentary activity ==
Aside from youth organisations, The Votes at 16 coalition has a vast supportive network of politicians who have backed the call to lower the voting age to 16 in the UK. These politicians range from local UK councils, Members of Parliament, Lords, and Members of European Parliament to Members of Scottish Parliament, Members of Legislative Assembly and Welsh Assembly Members.

In 2008 members of the coalition met a few MPs ahead of the second reading of the Voting Age (Reduction) Bill in the UK Parliament, but the bill was talked down by Stewart Jackson, Conservative MP for Peterborough. The Labour Party's Conference in 2008 voted to accept the recommendation of Labour's National Policy Forum to support Votes at 16.

A number of attempts were made to bring forward Bills to reduce the voting age including Jim McMahon's Private Members Bill Representation of the People (Young People's Enfranchisement and Education) Bill 2017-19, which again was talked out when it received its Second Reading in 2017.

=== UK Youth Parliament debate (2009–present) ===
Since 2009, the UK Youth Parliament (UKYP) has held an annual debate at the Houses of Parliament led by the Speaker of the House of Commons. Members of Youth Parliament debate five issues chosen by ‘Make Your Mark’, a ballot of young people from across the UK, and vote to decide which two issues should become the UKYP priority campaigns for the year ahead.

Votes at 16 is a reoccurring issue that has been selected as one of the top five topics multiple times since 2011, the most recent being in 2018, with over 80,000 11–18-year-olds voting in favour of the campaign.

Out of the five times Votes at 16 has been brought to debate, it has been chosen as a UKYP priority campaign a total of four times and was the lead UK-wide campaign for 2019.

=== Scottish independence referendum (2013) ===
The Scottish National Party (SNP), called for the voting age to be lowered to 16 and lowered the voting age to 16 for the referendum on Scottish Independence through the Scottish Independence Referendum (Franchise) Act 2013.

=== Voting age lowered to 16 for all Scottish elections (2015) ===
In 2015 the voting age for Scottish local elections and Scottish Parliament elections was reduced to 16 after the Scottish Elections (Reduction of Voting Age) Act 2015 was passed unanimously in the Scottish Parliament. This was in place for the first time at the 2016 Scottish Parliament election.

=== Westminster Hall Debate (2019) ===
On 3 April 2019, a Westminster Hall Debate was held on the issue, put forward by Jim McMahon who in 2017 tabled a Private Members’ Bill on votes at 16. He said: “Less than 50 years ago, 18, 19 and 20-year-olds were denied the right to vote [...] Our democracy and our franchise have always been evolving.” He later added that it was “scandalous” MPs have not voted on the issue. Minister for the Constitution, Chloe Smith, said it would not be given further consideration as lowering the age would break the Conservative Party manifesto.

=== Votes at 16 all-party parliamentary group ===
The all-party parliamentary group (APPG) on votes at 16 is a group of cross-party Members of Parliament allowing parliamentarians to meet to discuss a lower voting age, first established in March 2018. The purpose of the APPG is to bring together key voices from across Parliament to listen to evidence on the case for votes at 16, and to present this evidence to the Government.

In 2019, the APPG had co-chairs from the major parties. They were Peter Bottomley, Vicky Foxcroft, Alison Thewliss, Wendy Chamberlain, Liz Saville Roberts and Caroline Lucas.

The APPG's secretariat is the British Youth Council.

At the APPG's AGM held on Tuesday 2 April 2019, the Group published a Campaign Report reflecting on progress over the previous year.

=== Voting age lowered to 16 for Welsh elections (2019–2020) ===
The Welsh Assembly signalled its support for reducing the voting age to 16 and included the issue in a wider consultation on local government reform in 2019. In January 2020, legislation was passed to reduce the voting age to 16 for local elections and Senedd elections in Wales, which was active for the first time in the May 2021 Senedd election.

=== Voting age to be lowered to 16 for United Kingdom, English and Northern Ireland elections (2025–present) ===
In July 2025, the Government of the United Kingdom announced its plans for reducing the voting age after it had been included in the Labour Party's 2024 manifesto. The plans would apply to all elections in both England and Northern Ireland.
