= Act =

Act, ACT, or The Act may refer to:

== Arts and entertainment ==
=== Theatre and drama ===
- Acting, an activity in which a story is told by means of its enactment by an actor who adopts a character
- Act (drama), a major division or unit of drama, including plays, films, operas, ballets, or musicals
- A Contemporary Theatre (ACT), now Union Arts Center, in Seattle, Washington, US
- American Conservatory Theater, in San Francisco, California, US

=== Music ===
- Act (band), a British band
- ACT (Swedish band)
- The Act (band), a 1980s Norwegian rock band
- ACT Music, a German music label
- ACT (album), by Ben Wendel, Harish Raghavan, and Nate Wood, 2009
- Act (EP), by Kang Daniel, 2024
- Acts (album), by RNDM, 2012
- The Act (musical), 1977
- UnoTheActivist (Troy Vashon Donte Lane, born 1996), or The Act, American rapper

=== Film and television ===
- The Act (1989 film), a 1989 British television film by Richard Langridge
- The Act (TV series), a 2019 true crime TV series
- The Act (video game), 2007

== Business and organizations ==
=== Businesses ===
- AdaCore, formerly Ada Core Technologies, Ada specialist software company
- Advanced Cell Technology, Inc, now Astellas Institute for Regenerative Medicine
- Advanced Computer Techniques, an American software company 1962–1994
- Applied Computer Techniques, later Apricot Computers
- Atria Convergence Technologies, a telecommunications company in India
- Aviation Composite Technology, an aircraft manufacturer in the Philippines

=== Education ===
- ACT (for-profit organization)
  - ACT (test), a standardized test used for college admissions in the US
- Asian College of Technology, Cebu City, Philippines
- Australian College of Theology, now Australian University of Theology

=== Political organizations ===
- Act (Brazil), a political party
- Act! (Italy), a political party
- ACT-CIS Partylist, a political organization in the Philippines
- ACT New Zealand, a political party
- Agir (France) (French, 'Act'), a political party
- Alliance for Change and Transparency, a political party in Tanzania
- Alliance of Concerned Teachers, a political organization in the Philippines
- America Coming Together, an American political action group

=== Professional organizations ===
- Academy of Clinical Thyroidologists, US
- American College of Toxicology
- Association for Citizenship Teaching, UK
- Association of Corporate Treasurers, UK

=== Other organizations ===
- ACT Alliance, an alliance of churches provide humanitarian aid
- ACT Alberta, a Canadian coalition to raise awareness about human trafficking
- ACT for America, an anti-Islam advocacy group in the US
- Action for Children's Television, an American advocacy group
- Addenbrooke's Charitable Trust, a British charity
- Advanced Concepts Team, a research team of the European Space Agency
- Allied Command Transformation, a NATO strategic command
- Amazon Conservation Team, a non-profit organization that works to protect the Amazon rainforest
- Anglican Church in Thailand
- Association for Children with Life-threatening and Terminal conditions (ACT), now Together for Short Lives, a British children's charity
- Association of Commercial Television in Europe
- Australian Civic Trust, an urban design organization

== Law ==
- Act (document), an instrument that records a fact or something that has been said, done, or agreed
  - Notarial act
  - Act of parliament, passed by the legislative body of a jurisdiction
    - Act of Parliament (United Kingdom)
    - Act of Congress, United States
    - Act of Tynwald, Isle of Man
- Acting (law), temporarily exercising the powers of a vacant position
- Advance corporation tax, a tax collected in the UK until 1999

== Science and technology ==
=== Computing ===
- Act! LLC, a customer relationship management software
- ACT (Nasdaq) (Automated Confirmation of Transactions), a system for reporting and clearing trades
- Apple Certified Trainer, one of the Apple certification programs

=== Medicine ===
- Acceptance and commitment therapy, a type of cognitive-behavioral therapy
- Activated clotting time, a test of coagulation
- Adoptive cell transfer, transfer of cells into a patient, usually immune system cells
- Artemisinin-based combination therapies (ACTs) for malaria
- Assertive community treatment, an approach for community mental health service delivery

=== Other uses in science and technology ===
- ACT (audio format)
- Act or S-act, a semigroup action in algebra and theoretical computer science
- Astrographic Catalog/Tycho or Tycho-2 Catalogue, an astronomical catalogue
- Atacama Cosmology Telescope, in Chile

== Transportation ==
- Air ACT, a Turkish airline
- AC Transit, a bus transit operator in San Francisco Bay Area, US
- Agency for Community Transit Inc., operator of Madison County Transit services in the US
- Azienda comunale del traffico, a former transport operator in Lugano, Switzerland
- Puerto Rico Highways and Transportation Authority (Spanish: Autoridad de Carreteras y Transportación)
- Ford ACT, a 1970s people mover system
- Ascot railway station (Berkshire), England, station code ACT
- Waco Regional Airport, in Texas, US, IATA airport code ACT

== Other uses ==
- ACT mouthwash, produced by Opella North America
- Achterhooks, a Dutch dialect, ISO 639-3 language code act
- American Canadian Tour, a stock car racing series
- Australian Capital Territory, an internal territory of Australia, containing the capital city Canberra
- Courtney Act, Australian drag queen and TV personality
- Hamaas (Hebrew: המעש, lit. 'The Act') a propaganda newspaper of the Lehi, a terrorist group in 1940s Palestine

== See also ==
- AC-T (disambiguation)
- Behavior
- Acting rank, temporary military rank
- ACT-R, a symbolic cognitive architecture
- Association of Cinematograph, Television and Allied Technicians (ACCT), UK
