= British Youth Council =

UK charity

- Logo of the British Youth Council
- Successor: Youth Council UK run by National Youth Agency
- Founded: 1948
- Founder: The Foreign Office, UK Government
- Dissolved: 2024
- Type: UK charity
- Purpose: Youth representation
- Location: London, N1
- Region served: United Kingdom
- Services: UK Youth Parliament; House of Commons Youth Select Committee; Young Mayors Network; NHS England Youth Forum; Local Youth Council Network; UK Young Ambassadors; Bank of England Youth Forum
- Affiliations: European Youth Forum; Commonwealth Youth Programme
- Website: www.byc.org.uk

The British Youth Council (BYC) was a UK charity that worked to empower young people and promote their interests. The national charity, run by young people, existed to represent the views of young people to government and decision-makers at a local, national, European and international level; and to promote the increased participation of young people in society and public life. It was partly funded by the Department for Digital, Culture, Media and Sport and UK Parliament.

The charity announced its closure on 21st March 2024 after over 70 years working in the youth voice sector, following financial insolvency. All assets of the British Youth Council have been taken over by the National Youth Agency.

== History ==
=== Beginnings ===
The British Youth Council was established by the Foreign Office of the British Government in preparation for the first World Assembly of Youth. Its original aim was to unite young people in Britain against the forces of communism just after World War II.

=== 1960–69 ===
In 1963, the Council gained independence from the British Government and became a UK charity championing the opinions of young people.

From the late 1960s, the Council expanded its work in connecting youth councils across the UK – a move championed by then staff member John Denham, former Secretary of State for Communities and Local Government.

=== 1970–79 ===
In 1971, BYC organised the annual World Assembly of Youth event in Manchester where Prime Minister Edward Heath was the keynote speaker.

In the late 1970s, the organisation elected David Hunt as chair (now a member of the House of Lords) as well as Janet Paraskeva (now First Civil Service Commissioner) and Peter Mandelson.

BYC published the "Youth Unemployment: Cause and Cures" report. They also attended the 11th World Festival on Youth in Cuba where motions were passed on the human rights records of the USSR and USA. Delegates include Trevor Phillips, Paul Boateng and Charles Clarke MP.

=== 1980–89 ===
In 1987 BYC Scotland closed due to funding cuts by the Government. The British Youth Council also had its Foreign Office grant withdrawn due to the changes in international relations. However, the Council continued to promote local youth councils and was involved in the UK's signing of the UN Convention on the Rights of the Child.

=== 1990–99 ===
In the 1990s BYC worked with partners in campaigns to get young people registered to vote and on issues of young people's employment. They also worked in the field of youth policy and research, producing a number of journals and publications.

Notable publications during this decade include ‘Never Had it So Good: The Truth about being young in nineties Britain’ (1996), and the 1998 report ‘State of the Young Nation’, which asked 1000 young people about their participation in society and their understanding of political processes.

Continuing increase in BYC’s research, consultation and policy work culminated in 2000 with the biggest consultation with young people that the Government had ever commissioned on areas such as education, employment and young people having their say. The conclusion, 'Listening to the Unheard', led to the formulation of the European White Paper on Youth which BYC co-ordinated as the UK members of the European Youth Forum.

=== 2024 ===
On the 21st March 2024, BYC announced that due to financial difficulty and the administration of their financial backer, the Body Shop, the charity would shut down immediately. All assets were taken over by the National Youth Agency

== Governance ==
The British Youth Council Board of Trustees was made up of 12 young people aged 16–25. These annually elected trustees employed 14 staff and 10 full-time volunteers and managed a body of young campaigners and media spokespeople. The organisation was a registered charity, and a registered company limited by guarantee, in order to enable the appointment of directors under 18 years old.

== Membership ==
The Council had over 250 members including national youth organisations, faith-based groups, and organisations representing minority groups of young people. In addition, the Council supported a network of 620 youth councils and youth forums, also run by young people.

== Activities ==
The British Youth Council assists young people to represent themselves through activities such as Young People in Parliament Events, having their voices heard by politicians and policy makers. It sets up initiatives that celebrate young people's achievements such as the Royal Society of Arts Young Leader Awards. With support from the House of Commons, the British Youth Council established the Youth Select Committee which, in 2013, held an inquiry into the national curriculum with 11 young panel Members.

The Council supports young people to find volunteering opportunities and other opportunities for young people through its website, its membership base and through newsletters like the BYC Project and its Online Action Network.

It coordinates different youth-led networks such as the Local Youth Council Network, UK Youth Parliament & Young Mayors Network

=== Consortia ===
The British Youth Council now manages Participation Works – a group of national charities working to ensure that every child and young person can influence decisions affecting their lives. They are working with the Children's Rights Alliance for England, The National Youth Agency, the National Council for Voluntary Youth Services, Save the Children (England) and formerly the National Children's Bureau.

The Council is a founding member of the UK Votes at 16 Coalition. The coalition consists of various organisations and political parties and is led by the Children's Rights Alliance for England, the National Union of Students and the Scottish Youth Parliament.

Prior to the 2015 General Election, the Council became a founding member of the UK branch of the League of Young Voters The League's steering group consists of the Scottish Youth Parliament, Northern Ireland Youth Forum, Bite The Ballot and the National Union of Students.

The Council provides a range of training courses, many funded under schemes such as Youth at the Table.

=== Regional ===
The UK organization is separated into 12 regions: East Midlands, East of England, London, North East, North West, Northern Ireland, Scotland, South East, South West, Wales, West Midlands and Yorkshire and the Humber. Each hosts 3 annual conferences, known as conventions, which aim to promote and share good practice in Youth Voice work done by young people, including Members of Youth Parliament, Youth Councillors and Young Mayors.

==== Yorkshire and the Humber ====
The Yorkshire and Humber region consists of the Youth Councils of:

- Barnsley
- Sheffield
- Rotherham
- Doncaster
- Kingston upon Hull
- Calderdale
- York
- Leeds
- North Lincolnshire
- North-East Lincolnshire
- North Yorkshire
- Bradford
- Wakefield
- East Riding of Yorkshire
- Kirklees

Through the support of the Youth York Unit Yorkshire and Humber, an initiative has been established wherein each area elects a representative to the Yorkshire and Humber Youth Voice Steering Group, which meets a minimum of 4 times each year to co-ordinate regional youth voice work and to work on cross-boundary issues such as transport.

=== International ===
Since it began, the Council has been involved in international work which aims to develop an awareness of international issues and action and to represent the UK at international events

The British Youth Council works closely with the British Council to promote participation overseas. It is a member of the European Youth Forum and Commonwealth Youth Exchange Programme and cooperates with other National Youth Councils in European through the BBCplus cooperation of National Youth Councils in Europe.

== See also ==
- National Council for Voluntary Youth Services
- UK Youth Parliament
- National Children's Bureau
- The Prince's Trust
- Children's Commissioner for England
- The National Youth Agency
- Children's Rights Alliance for England
