= End Child Poverty coalition =

UK charitable organisation

End Child Poverty Coalition
- Founded: 2001
- Location: United Kingdom
- Members: 123+
- Employees: 1-10
- Website: endchildpoverty.org.uk

End Child Poverty coalition was set up in 2001 by a group of UK children's charities, social justice groups, faith-groups, trade unions and others concerned about what they considered the unacceptably high levels of child poverty in the UK.

It was established as a charity in 2003 with a single goal - to eradicate child poverty in the United Kingdom. In 2010 it was removed from the Charity Commission's register, and it is now hosted by the Child Poverty Action Group.

== Objectives ==
- Inform the public about the causes and effects of child poverty
- Forge a commitment between and across the public, private and voluntary sectors to end child poverty by 2020
- Promote the case for ending child poverty by 2020 with this and every future Government.

== Activities ==
The coalition involves children, young people, parents and professionals with experience and knowledge of poverty in a wide range of activities, such as awareness raising, campaigning and lobbying. The Coalition engages with all major UK political parties UK Labour Party, the Conservative Party (UK), the UK Liberal Democrats, the Scottish National Party, and the Green Party of England and Wales amongst others.

Further to this the coalition also engages with UK Government departments, wider civil society and philanthropists. Often holding events and meetings with them. Having held many meetings with politicians at the UK Parliament's House of Commons, Portcullis House and the House of Lords.

Notably, the End Child Poverty as a children's poetry anthology, a children Queen's speech and in lobbying the Chancellor and Government Ministers. lobbying the Chancellor and Government Ministers. The coalition has also organised cross-sector events such as the National Poverty Hearing, held on Wednesday 6 December 2006 working with Church Action on Poverty, Age Concern, Help the Aged, Joseph Rowntree Foundation, Oxfam, Poverty Alliance, Refugee Council, Shelter and the UK Coalition Against Poverty. The event engaged senior politicians, policy makers and opinion formers in the media and public life and grassroots anti-poverty/civil society groups from across the United Kingdom.

From the International Day for the Eradication of Poverty on 17 October until Universal Children's Day on 20 November End Child Poverty led a Month of Action to call attention to the millions of children in poverty and demand action; calling on the Government to place child poverty firmly at the centre of their agenda and asking the chancellor to ‘play ball!’ to deliver, in the Comprehensive Spending Review, the resources needed to end child poverty, once and for all.

== Funding members ==
Major funding members include: Barnardo's, The Children's Society, Action for Children, NSPCC, and Save the Children. Other members include The Church of England, Caritas, the Citizens Advice Bureau, Coram, the Family Holiday Association, Liberal Judaism, Mencap, the National Education Union, the National Union of Students, the National Youth Agency, the National Council for Voluntary Youth Services, Oxfam UK, Rathbone, Scope and Shelter.

== Youth Ambassadors ==
The Coalition has a number of Youth Ambassadors. The Youth Ambassador scheme was developed to ensure that the voices and experience of young people was included in the work of the Coalition.

Youth Ambassadors, are at the centre of the coalition, they engage with politicians, civil society and organisations within the coalition to provide insight into the negative impacts of child poverty.

== All Kids Count Campaign, two-child limit ==
The End Child Poverty Coalition has been the Campaigning force at the front of the Two-child policy, which holds 250,000 children in poverty across the UK. The scrapping of the Two-child policy was front and centre of the 2024 United Kingdom general election campaign.

== News coverage ==
Featured within; The Guardian, 'The National', The Big Issue, 'Yahoo News', 'The Morning Star', 'The Mirror'.

https://www.bigissue.com/news/social-justice/two-child-benefit-cap-uk-impact-dwp-poverty/

https://news.bbc.co.uk/2/hi/business/3478443.stm

https://www.theguardian.com/uk_news/story/0,,1924378,00.html

https://web.archive.org/web/20061023031427/http://news.independent.co.uk/uk/politics/article1886643.ece

https://web.archive.org/web/20070205120732/http://www.hm-treasury.gov.uk/Newsroom_and_Speeches/Press/2001/press_50_01.cfm

== Notable politicians met ==
Carla Denyer, David Linden (politician), Liz Kendall, Jonathan Ashworth, Diane Abbott, Baroness Margaret Eaton, Kim Johnson (politician), liz twist, rachel reeves.
