= UNICEF UK =

Organization

The British Committee for UNICEF

- Abbreviation: UNICEF UK
- Formation: 1956
- Type: National committee
- Legal status: Active
- Headquarters: London, UK
- Head: Olivia Colman (President, since 2020); Jon Sparkes (CEO, since 2022)
- Parent organization: UNICEF
- Website: unicef.org.uk

The British Committee for UNICEF, also known as UNICEF, is one of 32 UNICEF national committees based in industrialised countries. The national committees raise funds for the organisation's worldwide emergency and development work.

Internationally, UNICEF is the leading children's organisation, reaching children in more than 150 Less Developed Countries around the world. It works with local communities, organisations and governments to improve the lives of children. The organisation's global reach allows it to share knowledge across borders, while its local presence – over 85 per cent of UNICEF staff work in developing countries – means it can deliver assistance where it is needed most. UNICEF believes that every child should have clean water, food, health care, education, and a safe environment in which to grow up. The organisation upholds the UN Convention on the Rights of the Child and works to hold the international community responsible for their promises to children.

UNICEF is not funded by the UN. Instead, it relies on voluntary donations to fund its work for children worldwide. UNICEF raises funds for these programmes through donations, the sale of cards and gifts, partnerships with companies and special events. UNICEF is a registered charity. UNICEF also advocates for lasting change for children. For example, it works to change government policies and practices that are detrimental to children's rights in the Britain and internationally.

== People ==
Jon Sparkes was appointed CEO in January 2022.

Actress Olivia Colman, who became an official British Unicef Ambassador in 2019, was appointed president on 3 September 2020. The role is an honorary and voluntary one, "focused on raising awareness of issues facing children around the world and raising funds for Unicef’s work".

== UNICEF ambassadors ==
UNICEF UK has a long history of support from its ambassadors and high-profile supporters, who play a vital role in promoting UNICEF, advocating and fundraising on its behalf. Ambassadors help the organisation reach a wider audience, enabling it to highlight work undertaken to improve the lives of the most vulnerable children around the world.

All UNICEF ambassadors have been appointed because they have already demonstrated a commitment to the organisation's work. They dedicate time and energy in a variety of ways: visiting projects in the field and emergency situations, speaking to the media about what they have seen, or lobbying and raising money.

Current UNICEF UK ambassadors and high-profile supporters include Michael Sheen, David Beckham, Martin Bell, Orlando Bloom, Charley Boorman, Millie Bobby Brown, Sir Alex Ferguson, Ralph Fiennes, Ryan Giggs, Ewan McGregor, Jemima Khan, Sir Roger Moore, James Nesbitt, Vanessa Redgrave, Tom Hiddleston, Rita Ora, Olivia Colman and Robbie Williams.

== Youth Advisory Board ==
UNICEF UK has had a Youth Advisory Board since 2019. They aim to 'be influenced by and amplify their voices on our work and on children’s rights.' Past members have met with the Children's Minister, interviewed players during Soccer Aid, and took over the Executive term on World Children's Day. Terms last two years, and the current Board (2023 - 2025) includes: Dev (he/him), Finn (he/him), Tiana (they/them), Macey (she/her), Kaius (he/him), Ruby (she/her), Shafa (she/her) and Jonathan (he/him).

== Corporate partners ==
UNICEF is supported entirely by voluntary contributions and the support from corporate partners makes a significant contribution to its work. Companies that currently have a corporate partnership with UNICEF UK include 2021 Rugby League World Cup, Barclays, easyJet, Marks & Spencer, IKEA, Manchester United, EE, Pampers and Vodafone.

== Cards and gifts ==
UNICEF was the first charity to produce and sell cards for the purpose of raising funds. The very first UNICEF card was a Christmas card created in 1949. The card was a reproduction of a painting, sent as a thank you to UNICEF in 1947, by seven-year-old Jitka Samkova. Jitka's village in Czechoslovakia had received UNICEF emergency assistance after the Second World War.

Since 1949, UNICEF has continued to sell cards and gifts in order to raise money for children living in poverty around the world.

=== Inspired Gifts ===
In 2004 UNICEF UK expanded its range of cards and gifts to include a selection of 'Inspired Gifts'. These offer an opportunity to give a present which makes a real difference to the lives of children. The choice of Inspired Gifts is wide; however the selection changes periodically, depending on where the need is greatest. A typical range could vary from a cold-box vaccine carrier which helps to ensure that vaccines for children reach their destination in perfect condition, to a midwife kit which helps to safely deliver over 50 babies.

== Convention on the Rights of the Child ==
The 1989 United Nations Convention on the Rights of the Child is a comprehensive human rights treaty which enshrines specific children's rights in international law. These rights define universal principles and standards for the status and treatment of children worldwide.

The Convention spells out a specific role for UNICEF, in its capacity as the UN body responsible for the rights of children. UNICEF is required to promote the effective implementation of the Convention and to encourage international cooperation for the benefit of children. UNICEF is also entitled to be represented when each country's implementation of the Convention is considered by the Committee every five years.

== Emergency response ==
When an emergency strikes, UNICEF staff in the area react rapidly and the first aid usually arrives within 48 hours. Emergency specialists assess the immediate need, focusing on women and children. With permanent offices in the field, UNICEF is well placed to coordinate relief by road and air. Following emergency relief efforts, UNICEF works to promote long-term rehabilitation and improve conditions for children.

== Programmes in the UK ==
In the UK, UNICEF seeks to improve baby health and nutrition through its Baby Friendly Initiative in UK health care centres. It also champions child-centred education based on the UN Convention on the Rights of the Child through its Rights Respecting Schools Award initiative. UNICEF UK is a member of the National Council for Voluntary Youth Services (NCVYS).

UNICEF UK has asked the UK Government to a establish "a nationally-recognised suite of connected services" for babies and children under 5, which it describes as a "Baby and Toddler Guarantee".

== Other areas of work ==
UNICEF's other priorities include education for all, child survival, HIV and AIDS and child protection.

=== Education ===
On education, UNICEF is committed to giving girls and boys equal learning opportunities. It works to remove barriers that keep girls from attending school and to ensure that, once enrolled, they go on to graduate. UNICEF also supplies educational materials, mobilises teachers, registers children, prepares school facilities and develops curricula in countries affected by conflict and other emergencies.

=== Child survival ===
In terms of child survival, UNICEF is seeking to completely eradicate polio, to increase the percentage of children protected against malaria by mosquito nets, to protect children in the early years of life by promoting exclusive breastfeeding and to reduce the risk of children dying from diarrhoeal diseases by improving access to water and sanitation facilities.

=== HIV and AIDS ===
In 2005, UNICEF launched a five-year global campaign, Unite for Children, Unite against AIDS, to raise awareness about how HIV and AIDS are destroying the lives of children. The campaign aims to achieve four goals by 2010: to prevent new infections among young people by 25 per cent; to prevent mother-to-child transmission of HIV in 80 per cent of cases; to provide treatment for 80 per cent of HIV-positive children; and to protect, care for and support 80 per cent of children affected by HIV and AIDS, including those who have lost their parents to the disease.

=== Child protection ===
Protection from exploitation is a universal right of every child, as laid out in the UN Convention on the Rights of the Child, and UNICEF places a high priority on protecting children from all forms of violence and abuse. For example, in Sierra Leone, UNICEF helped more than 3,600 child soldiers leave army life, while in Burkina Faso, UNICEF's support helped secure passage of legislation that made female genital mutilation a punishable offence.

== See also ==
- UNICEF International
- Timeline of young people's rights in the UK
- List of UNICEF Goodwill Ambassadors
- UN Convention on the Rights of the Child
- Unite for Children, Unite Against AIDS
