= Leap Confronting Conflict =

Conflict resolution training

Leap Confronting Conflict logo

Established in 1987 by British Quaker Alec Davison,[1] Leap Confronting Conflict is a UK-based charity delivering training to young people aged 11–25, and the professionals working with them, to manage the conflict they experience in their lives and reduce violence in our communities.

== History ==
LEAP Confronting Conflict originally started in 1985 as a theatre project by The Leaveners, a Quaker arts charity, before developing into an independent organisation in 1999. LEAP ('Leaveners Experiments in Arts for Peace') initiated work with unemployed and homeless young people to help them deal with conflict through theatre projects in schools and prisons. In 1987 LEAP received support of the Joseph Rowntree Charitable Trust and the Quaker Peace Committee; in the following year the charity received three years of funding from the Department for Education and Science. Published in 1992, Leap’s first training manual entitled “Playing with Fire” sold out and was subsequently published by the New Society Press in the United States of America. This was followed by a handbook for young people entitled Fireworks! in 1993

In 1999, Leap Confronting Conflict became an independent registered charity and launched the Young Mediators Network (YMN) whilst Leap’s Quarrel Shop became the first Leap project to gain formal OCN accreditation. 2002 saw Leap expand their outreach to Glasgow as they launched their first gang project in the city. The organisation’s conference “Gangs! What Gangs?” delivered in 2003 was marked by a major piece in The Guardian.

The Institute for Public Policy Research recommended Leap’s work in educational institutions in 2006 as Leap published it manual, “Working with Gangs and Young People”. The following year saw the charities expansion as Leap recruited regional staff in Yorkshire and the South West following which the Department for Children, School and families awarded the charity Pathfinder status

At the 2009 Charity Awards, Leap had the honour of being the Overall winner as well as winning the Children and Youth Category.

In 2012 Leap won a National Partners Award from the National Council for Voluntary Youth Services (NCVYS) for involving young people in the planning and decision making processes of their work.

In 2013 Leap launched the first Lighting the Fire – The Leap Annual Excellence awards to recognise the achievements of young people and professionals managing conflict in our communities. Leap were also runners up for Britain's Most Innovative Charity in the Third Sector Britain's Most Admired Charity Awards.

== Activities and Programs ==
Leap has innovated many programs in conflict resolution which include Peerlink, a national peer mediation and youth conflict resolution network and support project; Quarrel Shop, a training course for 16- to 21-year-olds in peer mediation and conflict resolution and Working with Gangs, a course based on training and research in the area of gangs and territorialism in communities around the UK.

Leap has developed programmes as part of partnerships with domestic abuse charity SafeLives and the Addressing Sexual Bullying Across Europe (ASBAE) project around sexual violence and sexual bullying.
