= National B&B Week =

National B&B Week, previously known as National B&B Day, is an annual event which aims to raise the profile of the independent accommodation sector in the UK and encourage holidaymakers to book a stay in a B&B over the course of the week and throughout the year. In the UK, 20,000 B&Bs together contribute £3.6 billion the economy every year.

Organisers had to cancel National B&B Week 2020, due to take place 16–22 March, because of the restrictions imposed in response to COVID-19.

== National B&B Day 2018 ==
The inaugural National B&B Day took place during English Tourism Week on 28 March 2018. It received strong support from the UK hospitality industry, with over 230 B&Bs signing up through the official National B&B Day website and creating unique customer offers to celebrate the day. It also received backing from the UK government through:

1. An Early Day Motion in parliament:

"That this House notes that there are some 25,000 B&Bs and guest houses across the UK, with a combined direct turnover well in excess of £2 billion; stresses the important role that B&Bs play in rural and coastal areas, where they are often the only tourism accommodation and play a key function in supporting local livelihoods; urges all hon. Members to visit local B&Bs on 24 March 2018 for National B&B day; and calls on the Government to support B&Bs as an integral part of the UK’s tourism sector.

2. Michael Ellis, the UK Tourism Minister, issuing a supporting statement:

“Millions of tourists from the UK and abroad get a great night’s sleep and a delicious breakfast every year, thanks to the hard work of these entrepreneurial small businesses up and down the country. These are businesses that create valuable jobs in their local communities and together contribute over £2bn to the UK economy each year. This day serves to highlight the vital role that B&Bs play in Britain’s cultural and economic life and I am delighted to support National B&B Day 2018.”

3. Lobbying and governmental support led to a number of UK MPs visiting B&Bs nationwide.

A promotional B&B Breakfast cookbook was released in celebration of the day, with proceeds going to the Family Holiday Association. The day itself was covered by a range of regional press, such as the Blackpool Gazette.

Independent accommodation booking software eviivo reported that in the week following National B&B Day 2018, their 6,600 UK B&B customers saw a year on year increase in forward bookings of 8%.

== National B&B Week 2019 ==
Due to the huge success of National B&B Day in 2018, the organisers extended the event, which ran from 18 – 24 March 2019, and renamed it to National B&B Week. Collaborating with The Family Holiday Association, 60 rooms were pledged to help provide holiday experiences to struggling families.
