= WYP =

WYP may refer to:

- The West Yorkshire Playhouse, a theatre in Leeds, UK
- West Yorkshire Police, a police force in the UK
- World Year of Physics 2005, a commemoration of physics
- Welsh Youth Parliament, a youth parliament based in Wales
