= Peter Eccles =

Peter Eccles may refer to:

- Peter Eccles (footballer) (born 1962)
- Peter Eccles (mathematician) (born 1945)
