= ACT (audio format) =

Lossy audio recorder format

ACT audio file
- Filename extension: .act
- Developed by: Actions Semiconductor
- Type of format: audio file
- Standard: most Chinese MP3 and MP4 players

ACT is a lossy ADPCM 8 kbit/s compressed audio format recorded by most Chinese MP3 and MP4 players with a recording function, and voice recorders.

Many models of recorder that use the ACT format do so only for their lowest-quality recording setting; if the quality setting is increased then a different format, typically WAV, is used, creating much larger files.

There are different versions of ACT; files produced by later devices could not as of June 2009 be read by any free standard audio player and converter software, only by the supplied MP3 utilities.

== Decoding .act files ==
=== Using Windows ===
Devices which record in this format are usually supplied with an ACT to WAV converter program that runs under Microsoft Windows; the converter usually used can be downloaded as part of MP3 Player Utilities. Konvertor can play and convert the format too.

=== Using Linux ===
Linux command-line utility SoX supports .act files. The following command converts an .act file to another format:

sox -i -r8k -tima -c1 infile.act outfile
