= Hi-Yo Silver! =

- Born: Bjørn Kulseth; 7 March 1962 (age 64)
- Origin: Norway
- Genres: Pop
- Occupation: Singer-songwriter
- Instruments: Vocals; guitar
- Years active: 1980–present
- Label: EMI Odeon

Hi-Yo Silver! was a musical solo project by Bjørn Kulseth, the former lead singer and songwriter of the Norwegian rock band the Act. The only Hi-Yo Silver! album was entitled Away and was released in 1988.

== History ==
The first and thus far only solo album by the Norwegian singer and songwriter Bjørn Kulseth was recorded in the summer of 1987. After a week of preproduction in the Pan Studio in Skjetten north of Oslo, producer Steve Forward and Bjørn Kulseth spent the next five weeks in UK recording studios owned by Phil Manzanera and Manfred Mann: The Gallery in Chertsey and The Workhouse in South London respectively.

The resulting album was credited to Hi-Yo Silver! and entitled Away, which in combination is the command that the cartoon/film hero The Lone Ranger gives to his horse Silver at the end of every story as they ride away in search for new adventures.

Even though the Hi-Yo Silver! album featured a few country & western touches such as pedal and lap steel guitar, the overall sound is more contemporary late 1980s pop music with sequencers, synthesizers and even some dance oriented grooves.

In fact the first version of the cover, with a portrait of Kulseth taken late at night at great expense in front of a joyride in the Gothenburg fairground Liseberg, was rejected by EMI for looking too "country". So the released cover features Kulseth sitting in the shuttle of a space rocket, wearing a fringed silver leather jacket and cradling his newly silver painted Gretch-guitar with the name "Silver" engraved on the neck.

Despite a big budget from EMI and much acclaim from the media, Away proved to be a commercial failure when it was released in Norway in March 1988. By then though, Kulseth and his younger brother Stein Kulseth had already started a new roots rock band called The Contenders.

== Musicians ==
- Ian Porter – programming and keyboards
- John Lingwood – drums
- Dave Bronze – bass
- Robin Boult – guitars
- Tommy Willis – lap steel guitar
- Vic Collins – pedal steel guitar
- Matt Irving – keyboards
- Chris Batchelor – trumpet
- Frank Mead – saxophone
- Steve Sidelnyk – percussion
- John Wilson – backing vocals
- Tim Haine – backing vocals
- The Sapphires – backing vocals
- Bjørn Kulseth – vocals and guitars

== Discography ==
=== Album ===
- Away (1988), EMI Odeon

=== Singles ===
- "Get Rich (In a Hurry)" b/w "Top of the World" (1988), EMI Odeon
- "Nervous in the Night" b/w "My Father's Name Is Dad" (1988), EMI Odeon
- "Nervous in the Night" (12" Takeoff Mix) b/w "My Father's Name Is Dad" / "Nervous in the Night" (1988), EMI Odeon

== Sources ==
- Norwegian pop and rock encyclopaedia. Vega Forlag 2005. ISBN 978-82-92489-09-3.
- G-STRENG Website
