= AC-T =

AC-T may refer to:

- AC-Taxol, a combination breast cancer chemotherapy regimen
- Albert City–Truesdale Community School District, a school district in Iowa
- Asheville Citizen-Times, a newspaper based in Asheville, North Carolina, occasionally abbreviated by other outlets as AC-T

== See also ==
- ACT (disambiguation)
