= Member of Youth Parliament =

Individual in the UK Youth Parliament

In the United Kingdom, a Member of Youth Parliament (MYP) is an individual aged between 11 and 18 elected by young people to represent their local area on the UK Youth Parliament.

== Elections ==
There are 350 members of youth parliament, elected on a two year term. Whilst the electoral system is not uniform, most Local Authority Areas choose to use the first-past-the-post system. Local Authority Areas are designated as constituencies, and are allocated a number of MYPs dependent on the size of the youth population in the LAA. Some constituencies have multiple members therefore, for example Leeds has 3 MYPs whereas the City of York has 1 MYP.

Constituencies with multiple MYPs often choose to use the portfolio system, where each MYP has a portfolio of interest topics that they represent their constituents on.

Some areas may also choose to elect one or more informal Deputy Members of Youth Parliament (DMYPs), who deputise for their MYPs according to diary restrictions. However, the position of DMYP is not an official position in the UK Youth Parliament and DMYPs are not afforded any special recognition or privileges. The local youth council for an MYP may also choose someone else to deputise in the MYP's place instead of a DMYP.

There is not a single date for MYP election, this is done through an election season which typically occurs from January to March, before full induction in April. Elections are usually conducted in conjunction with the Make your Mark referendum.

=== Scotland ===
Scotland does not directly elect MYPs. The Scottish Youth Parliament has 200 Members of the Scottish Youth Parliament (MSYPs) by electing 2 in every Scottish Parliament constituency which returns 146 constituency MSYPs. The other 56 are appointed from voluntary organisations. Delegates to UKYP events are chosen by the Scottish Youth Parliament.

Due to the nature of their devolution, Scottish MYPs do not have DMYPs.

== History ==
The title of Member of Youth Parliament was created upon the organisation's formation in June 1999. Though only a smaller number existed at first, this has now expanded beyond 350 members, with over 12,000 young people standing for the position in their local areas during the 2008 annual elections.

== Eligibility ==
To be eligible to stand as an MYP, a person must be between 11 and 18 (inclusive). A person does not need to be a citizen of the UK, however they must go to school or live in the LAA constituency they are seeking to represent.

When a Member of Youth Parliament turns 19, they cease to represent their constituency and trigger a by-election, which is to be arranged by the LAA.

== Title ==
Members of Youth parliament are entitled to use the post-nominal initials MYP. Deputy Members of Youth Parliament have no formal post-nominal initials however some use DMYP to show their role. When referred to in speech MYPs can be referred to as "the member for [LAA Constituency]".

== Responsibilities ==
MYPs have an obligation to represent the views of their constituents faithfully, they are obligated to not be influenced by partisan alignment or any activity that may threaten the apoliticality of the UK Youth Parliament. This primary role is the main purpose of MYPs, although regional and national involvement is also expected.

Given that every LAA has different community action groups, MYPs have no constitutional obligation to be a member of these, however they are expected to dialogue with these groups to best represent their constituents.

MYPs are expected to spend 1-5 hours a week on constituency work and campaigning in their constituency, through attending meetings with MPs, holding surgeries, and general outreach. Monthly meetings are organised by the Steering Group members in each region, in order to provide regional cohesion.

An Annual Sitting is held which all members are welcome to attend. Special debates are also held within the House of Commons and House of Lords. Both of these instances are historic in their overturning of ancient protocol, requiring that only members of the respective houses be allowed to sit within them.

== See also ==
- UK Youth Parliament
