= UK Youth Parliament =

Youth organisation in the United Kingdom

- Abbreviation: UKYP
- Formation: 9 June 1998
- Legal status: Charity
- Headquarters: London, England
- Region served: United Kingdom
- Members: 364 (2017)
- Official language: English
- Parent organisation: National Youth Agency (from May 2024); British Youth Council (defunct)
- Affiliations: Scottish Youth Parliament, Young Mayors Network, Welsh Youth Parliament
- Website: nya.org.uk/ukyp (from May 2024) ukyouthparliament.org.uk (defunct)

The UK Youth Parliament (UKYP) is a youth organisation in the United Kingdom, consisting of democratically elected members aged between 11 and 18.

Formed in 1999, the parliament has over 300 members, who are elected to represent the views of young people in their area to government and service providers. Over 500,000 young people vote in the elections each year, which are held in over 70 percent of constituencies.

Someone who is elected to the UKYP is known as a Member of Youth Parliament (MYP). Members meet regularly to hold debates and plan campaigns both locally and on a national level, which includes the annual debate within the Chamber of the House of Commons, co-chaired by the Speaker Lindsay Hoyle and Deputy Speakers. Young people hold positions throughout the organisation's management, and it is endorsed by the majority of the UK's political parties.

== Formation and history ==
The concept of a United Kingdom Youth Parliament first arose at an event in Coventry entitled "Heirs To The Millennium". After the event, the MP Andrew Rowe and the National Society for the Prevention of Cruelty to Children and youth worker Kate Parish began to develop a proposal for the youth advocacy group. In 1998, a steering committee was formed, led by Andrew Rowe and chaired by a young person named Jannik Ecke.

In 2000, Malcolm Wicks, Department for Education and Employment, agreed to employ a member of staff who would work full-time on developing the UK Youth Parliament alongside Kate Parish. Soon after, the first elections for the UK Youth Parliament were held, with the first Annual Sitting being held in 2001.

In 2025, a survey found that 26% of young people had heard of the programme. According to Peter Swallow, the last full two-year funding commitment given by DCMS came to £750,000; this funding provided support to the UKYP Programme and the Youth Select Committee.

== Composition ==
=== Membership ===
A Member of Youth Parliament (MYP) works with MPs, service providers, and decision makers in order to present the views of their constituents to them. Deputy Members of Youth Parliament (DMYP/SMYP) may also be elected, although not every MYP has a deputy. Deputies work with and support their Member of Youth Parliament locally and regionally, but are not entitled to attend the Annual Conference or other national events – unless their MYP is unable to.

There are 391 constituencies that MYPs can sit in.

=== Elections ===
The UK Youth Parliament elections are held every one or two years (depending on the local authority), with all young people between the ages of 11 and 18 being entitled to vote or stand.

Over one million votes were cast in the elections between 2006 and 2009. In 2008, 565,802 young people voted, with 1,625 standing as candidates from across England, Wales, and Northern Ireland.

== Meetings ==
=== Annual Conference ===
The Annual Conference is the parliament's main yearly meeting, which all Members of Youth Parliament attend.

==== Past Annual Conferences ====
The 9th Annual Sitting was held at the University of Kent from 24 July to 27 July 2009. The keynote speakers were:

- John Bercow, Speaker of the House of Commons
- Wes Streeting, President of the National Union of Students
- Jonathan Shaw, Minister for the South East
- Rowan Williams, the Archbishop of Canterbury

=== House of Lords debates ===
In May 2008, the UKYP was granted permission to hold a debate between over 300 MYPs in the House of Lords, making it one of only two organisations to ever use the venue for non-Parliamentary proceedings, the other being the English Speaking Union for their International Mace Final on 12 May 2007.

=== House of Commons debates ===
==== 2007–09 ====
Prime Minister Gordon Brown suggested that members of the UK Youth Parliament could have annual access to the House of Commons chamber in 2007, but this did not come about until March 2009, when a motion was passed to allow the UK Youth Parliament to use the House of Commons for that year's annual meeting. However, a Conservative Member of Parliament objected, which forced a vote to be taken on the issue, also employing a procedure called "I spy strangers" (historically used to expel disruptive spectators, but now mostly to disrupt the House's business) to take business in the House beyond 7:00pm and stifle any possible debate on the issue. On 12 March, a second debate was held in the House of Commons with a vote set to be taken four days later.

On 16 March 2009, 189 Members of Parliament voted to allow the UK Youth Parliament to debate in the House of Commons, with 16 votes of opposition by Conservative backbenchers. It was the first time in history that the House of Commons chamber was used by a group other than MPs.

The debates were chaired by John Bercow, Speaker of the House of Commons, who closed the event with a dramatic speech to MYPs in which he described the British National Party as "a poison which we could well do without". The Speaker is usually expected to remain impartial, so as not to compromise his authority, but in this case was able to express personal opinion because the ornamental mace that indicates Parliament is sitting was not in place.

==== 2022 ====
The 2022 Sitting was the first formal sitting since 2019. 5 topics were debated, derived from the initial 2022 Make Your Mark results, which saw Health and Wellbeing come out on top. The 5 topics which were debated were:

- Impact of Discrimination on Health
- Environment and Health
- Education and Health
- Cost of Living and Health
- Mental Health

The speech for the Cost of Living and Health, was led by Eshan Bilal, Member of Youth Parliament for Burnley and Pendle, which also happened to win a majority in the voting, meaning that this was the new Priority Campaign.

==== 2023 ====
In 2023, for the first time, UK Youth Parliament had visiting representatives at the House of Commons debates of the Crown Dependencies of Jersey, Guernsey and the Isle of Man as well as from the UK Overseas Territories including Anguilla and Bermuda.

It was also the first time that the UK Youth Parliament debated surrounding their campaign, Free School Meals. Out of the 5 topics debated, Financing and Funding came out on top, meaning that this became the priority campaign for the rest of the term.

==== 2025 ====
At the 2025 Youth Parliament debate, 10-year-old Owen Glass from Tristan da Cunha became the youngest ever person to give a speech in the House of Commons.

== Organisation ==
=== Governance ===
==== Steering Group ====
Decisions regarding the development and progression of the organisation is undertaken by the Steering Group, made up of one former MYP elected from each region and nation (known as "SGs"), for a 24-month term. Their main focus is "key decisions relating to the membership and the programme of work, within the given strategic boundaries".

They aim to meet bi-monthly, with additional meetings when required in the lead up to busy events, such as the House of Commons sitting and the Annual Conference.

The name of the group was changed from Procedures Group to Steering Group in November 2019 in order to reflect the groups varied responsibilities better. It was later changed in 2025 to Programme Committee to reflect organisational changes made under NYA guardianship and changed back to the Steering Group in 2026.

==== Management and support ====
The National Youth Agency manages the UK Youth Parliament, after securing the contract in May 2024.

The UK Youth Parliament was previously managed by the British Youth Council who won a bid in 2011, granted by the Department for Education to lead a national Youth Voice Service. Youth Voice supported young people in influencing local and national Government decision making in England, and provide continued support for the UK Youth Parliament. The British Youth Council announced their closure, after over 75 years.

The corporate and administrative governance is now overseen by the Board of Trustees of the National Youth Agency.

== Reception ==
=== Praise ===
The organisation has been endorsed by former Prime Ministers Gordon Brown and David Cameron. It has also been endorsed by former Liberal Democrat Party Leader and former Deputy Prime Minister Nick Clegg. In 2009, Brown described the UK Youth Parliament as "a symbol of the politics we should all strive for – politics that bring people together to work for what is best for us all."

In 2006, the organisation's Head of Programmes Kate Parish was given a National Council for Voluntary Youth Services Award, for her "commendable dedication to the development of UK Youth Parliament".

In 2008, the UK Youth Parliament was given the Positive Images award by the Children & Young People Now magazine for exposing young people's experiences of the current levels of sex and relationships education in a high-profile publicity campaign. In 2009, the organisation also received a Brook special achievement award for this campaign.

=== Criticism ===
A study by the University of Colorado found that youth participation organisations in the UK, including the UK Youth Parliament, needed to "tackle the unintentional practice of tokenism". The paper concludes that "failing to act upon [young people's] opinions or take them very seriously" once they are identified is often a cause of frustration amongst participants.

== Notable alumni ==
- Lauren Sullivan
- Keir Mather
- Dev Sharma
- Rhammel Afflick
- Chris Curtis
- Adam Jogee
- David Taylor
- Lloyd Hatton
- Alicia Kearns
- Lloyd Russell-Moyle
- Elliot Colburn

== See also ==
- Scottish Youth Parliament
- Welsh Youth Parliament
- Youth politics
- Youth organisations in the United Kingdom
- Youth unemployment in the United Kingdom
