= The Contenders (band) =

- Origin: Oslo, Norway
- Genre: Roots rock
- Years active: 1988–present
- Label: EMI

The Contenders were a Norwegian roots rock band in the early 1990s.

== Band members ==
- Bjørn Kulseth – vocals & guitars
- Stein Kulseth – vocals, piano, accordion, guitar & mandolin
- Odd Eirik Fleischer – bass & vocals
- Per Ivar Stræte – drums
- Arnfinn Tørrisen – guitars (1991– present)

=== Former members ===
- Stein Ramberg – guitars (1988–1989)
- Bjørn Gulliksen – vocals & guitars (1987–88)

== History ==
In the fall of 1987, Bjørn Kulseth was waiting for the release of his first solo album Away, recorded in England that summer and due for release under the "project name" Hi-Yo Silver! in March 1988 . Having broken up The Act in January 1987 after four years of regular gig playing, he was now yearning to get back on stage.

So initially just to have some fun and play a few gigs, Kulseth rounded up his younger brother Stein and the rhythm section they had played with while growing up in Flisa, a rural village close to the deep forests by the Swedish border. The last recruit was Bjørn Gulliksen, the front man of The Ramblers from Kongsberg who were also handled by Kulseth's manager.

From the first show – playing mostly pub rock classics and a few new originals by the Kulseth brothers – word got around that the guy from The Act had a new band with three frontmen, and offers for performances started coming in. So when his pop oriented solo album launched with reviews and nearly no sales, Bjørn Kulseth just kept on gigging with The Contenders and writing new songs with his brother.

After a few months, Bjørn Gulliksen found two bands to be one too many and was replaced by lead guitarist Stein Ramberg, who had played with Bjørn Kulseth in The Act in 1984.

In the spring of 1988, The Contenders started a residency at Cruise Café, Oslo's main venue for Americana music. Every week the band invited other Norwegian performers they respected as special guests: Singers like Trond Granlund, Henning Kvitnes, Jan Dahlen and Pål Andreassen. On the back of this residency, The Contenders were hired to back US singer-songwriter Steve Young (best known for Eagles' cover of his song "Seven Bridges Road") on a Norwegian tour.

In the summer of 1988 the band recorded demos of three of their own songs. A version of "Ain't That Brave" from this session was included on the Norwegian Garage Rock collection Rock 'n' Roll Stowaways Vol. 1. Later that summer they played alongside Tom Russell and Backstreet Girls at Down on the Farm: An event that started out as a barbecue for musicians and friends and in a few years become the premier Norwegian roots festival with audiences up to 5,000.

== First album ==
In the spring of 1989, the band hired Oslo's all digital BEL Studio for four nights. Thirteen songs were recorded and produced by the Kulseth brothers with engineer Gragg Lunsford. EMI – Kulseth's label for both The Act and the solo album released under the project name Hi-Yo Silver! – got the first listen and decided to buy the master and sign the band. Released in January 1990, the debut album The Contenders features 11 tracks written by the Kulseth brothers, a rollicking boogie woogie-style cover of Hank Williams' "Jambalaya" and the first released recording of "A Little Love is a Dangerous Thing" by US songwriters Katy Moffatt and Tom Russell.

The critics were enthusiastic, with possibly the highest praise coming from the veteran Swedish critic Mats Olsson of Expressen. Annoyed that a new generation of Norwegian sports stars were now beating the Swedes, Olsson "worried" that The Contenders' debut album might signal a similar trend in rock music. The single "Sweet Little Thing" – written and sung by Stein Kulseth – got a fair amount of airplay and the band was invited to perform on both local and national TV. More importantly, the album helped to establish The Contenders as one of the most popular live bands of the time.

When guitarist Stein Ramberg left to play with Casino Steel – the Norwegian pianist who had been in the UK punk band The Boys in the 1970s – The Contenders continued as a quartet for almost a year. As they started preparing for the second album, they recruited Arnfinn Tørrisen who was originally also from Flisa, the town the others had grown up in. Tørrisen was known as the Norwegian Albert Lee and had been playing professionally since he was seventeen with Norwegian country acts like Big Hand Johansen's Country Team, Lillian Askeland, Bjøro Håland, Egil "Gille" Larsen, Teddy Nelson, G. Thomas etc.

== Second album ==
In the fall of 1991 the band headed down south to Halden close the Swedish border, to record their next album at the residential studio Athletic Sound with house engineer Kai Andersen. The Kulseth brothers had by now been writing new songs for their live gigs for two years and had a good selection to choose from. One song seemed particularly promising: A midtempo tune called "Radioland" which was a tongue-in-cheek commentary on all the late night request shows that had become popular as Norwegian airwaves were opened up for competition during the 1980s. To maximise the song's commercial potential, "Radioland" and two other tracks were brought to Stockholm to be mixed by Dan Sundquist, the Swedish musician who had been in the new romantic band Reeperbahn in the early 1980s and who by now was a successful engineer/producer with a Swedish Grammy for Best Producer in 1988.

When the Radioland album was released in January 1992, the whole campaign was focused on the title tune. The strategy worked. The single "Radioland" topped the airplay charts for four weeks and helped to sell close to 15.000 copies of the album. The Kulseth brothers now signed an international publishing contract with the Stockholm-branch of EMI Music Publishing. The critics were also enthusiastic about the new and modernized version of The Contenders, with several comparisons made to the transformation Tom Petty had recently gone through by working with Jeff Lynne.

In March 1992, The Contenders were happy to be invited to support Tom Petty at his sold-out shows in Gothenburg's Scandinavium and Stockholm's Globen. So after performing songs like "Louisiana Rain" and "Listen to Her Heart" hundreds of times during the previous 10 years, Bjørn Kulseth got to celebrate his 30th birthday on March 7. by supporting the writer of those songs in front of 12.000 Stockholmians and later hanging out with The Heartbreakers at the legendary Café Opera.

With two weeks notice, The Contenders were now invited to compete in the Norwegian Final of the Eurovision Song Contest, traditionally a huge television event watched by virtually all Norwegians. The band quickly wrote and recorded their first ever song in Norwegian with the title "Munn mot munn metoden" (i.e. "The mouth to mouth method"). After the live and directly televised performance in Oslo Spektrum on March 21. the regional juries voted The Contenders' song in at next to last of the ten entries.

Much of the summer of 1992 was spent on the road, with highlights being an outdoors show in the port of Malmø during Euro 92 (The 1992 UEFA European Football Championship) in June and The Molde International Jazz Festival in July. In the fall of 1992, The Contenders were invited to contribute to a double tribute album to the Norwegian singer-songwriter Åge Aleksandersen. The Contenders chose to cover "Kvalmen" ("Nausea") from Aleksandersen's 1979 album French Only.

== Third album ==
Though neither of The Contenders' first experiments with signing in their native language were particularly successful, the Kulseth brothers decided that Norwegian lyrics was their future. They worked hard on their songwriting and in the fall of 1993 had enough songs to start recording their third album. As on Radioland they started recording basic tracks in Halden's Athletic Sound, but then moved on to Studio Nova in Spydeberg for overdubs and mixing.

In January 1994 the album Amors bil (i.e. "Cupid's Car"), was released. The first single "Folkets Hus" (i.e. "Community Hall") - an allegory on the fall of the post World War II social democratic solidarity - became a minor radio hit. The second single "Indianere" (i.e. "Red Indians") also received much airplay, but even though the critics lauded the band's new blend of classic Americana music with Norwegian lyrics, the album sales never took off.

After touring the Amors Bil album, Per Ivar Stræte found he had developed tinnitus and put his drums in storage. The rest of the band then joined forces with the singer-songwriter Roy Lønhøiden as a third front man and called themselves Kulseth & Lønhøiden Almenning. Lønhøiden had grown up in roughly the same area as The Contenders and after singing in English in the boy/girl duo Peyton Place (one self-titled album on Sony in 1994) he had also decided to switch to Norwegian.

Kulseth & Lønhøiden Almenning released their one self-titled album in 1998 on Bjørn Kulseth's own label Norskamerikaner (i.e. Norwegian-American). Bjørn Kulseth has later produced and released solo albums by Roy Lønhøiden in 2004 and 2006 on this label. Stein Kulseth has also worked with Lønhøiden as a songwriter and studio musician and has since 1999 been a semi-permanent member of veteran Norwegian roots singer Trond Grandlund's band.

The guitarist Arnfinn Tørrisen started playing and writing songs with J. T. Lauritsen & the Buckshot Hunters in 1995 and they have since released four albums. Tørrisen has also recorded and performed with Roy Lønhøiden. In 1998, the bass player Odd-Eirik Fleischer joined Home Groan, a band led by The Contenders' former soundman Martin Hagfors, which have since released 10 albums.

The drummer Per-Ivar Stræte learned to live with the tinnitus after a few years and the last line-up of The Contenders occasionally reunites for one-off gigs, mainly around Christmas time in their old hometown Flisa.

== Discography ==
=== Albums ===
- The Contenders (EMI Odeon 1989)
- Radioland (EMI 1992)
- Amors bil (EMI 1994)

=== Singles ===
- "Sweet Little Thing" b/w "A Little Love (is a Dangerous Thing)"

(Blue vinyl promo single, EMI Odeon 1989)

- "Radioland" b/w "You're So Swell"

(Vinyl single, EMI 1991)

- "Radioland" c/w "Ride Away" & "Saturday Roadhouse Fight"

(CD single, EMI 1992)

- "Munn mot munn metoden" c/w "Rock 'n' Roll Hurricane"

(CD single, EMI 1992)

- "Folkets hus"

(CD promo single in cardboard cover, EMI 1993)

- "Indianere" c/w "Amors bil" (live)

(CD single, EMI 1994 )

=== Compilations ===
- "Ain't That Brave" on Rock 'n' Roll Stowaways Vol. 1

(Vinyl album, That's Entertainment 1988)

- "Kvalmen" on Æ - A tribute to Åge Aleksandersen

(Double CD, Norske Gram 1992)

== Sources ==
- Norwegian pop and rock encyclopaedia. Vega Forlag, 2005. ISBN 978-82-92489-09-3.
- G-STRENG website
