= Peter Eccles (mathematician) =

British mathematician (born 1945)

- Born: Peter John Eccles; 6 September 1945 (age 81); Blackpool, Lancashire
- Occupation: Mathematician

Academic background
- Education: Clare College, Cambridge (1964–1968), Victoria University of Manchester (1968–1971)
- Alma mater: Victoria University of Manchester
- Thesis: The Γ Construction for Stable Homotopy Theory (1972)
- Doctoral advisor: Michael George Barratt

Academic work
- Discipline: Mathematics
- Sub-discipline: Topology
- Institutions: University of Manchester (Emeritus Professor), Semitone Studios (Owner)
- Main interests: Immersions of manifolds in Euclidean space
- Notable works: Introduction to Mathematical Reasoning: Numbers, Sets and Functions (1997), The Presence in the Midst: Reflections on Discernment (2009)

Peter John Eccles (born 6 September 1945) is a British mathematician and emeritus professor of mathematics at the University of Manchester. Eccles specialises in homotopy theory and its applications to different topology. Eccles taught a wide variety of pure mathematics throughout his career, and published the book Introduction to mathematical reasoning in 1997.

In addition to his mathematical publications, Eccles has been active in the Religious Society of Friends (Quakers) nationally and internationally throughout his adult life and was invited to give the 2009 Swarthmore Lecture, which was published as The presence in the midst: reflections on discernment.

== Early life ==
Peter Eccles grew up in Blackpool, attending Blackpool Grammar School. He studied at Clare College, Cambridge and then later at the Victoria University of Manchester, where he obtained his PhD in 1972 with thesis The Gamma Construction for Stable Homotopy Theory written under the direction of Michael George Barratt.

Eccles grew up attending Blackpool Quaker Meeting and during his teenage years developed a passionate interest in classical music, playing the piano, violin, and viola as a child.

== Career ==
From 1971 until 2015, Eccles taught in various roles at the University of Manchester, moving from Lecturer, through to Senior Lecturer, Professor and finally Emeritus Professor. In 1971, he was appointed Lecturer in Mathematics at the Victoria University of Manchester, where he worked until his retirement as Professor of Mathematics in 2015. Also from 1977, through to 1978, he spent a year as Visiting Assistant Professor of Mathematics at Northwestern University, Illinois.

Whilst teaching at the University of Manchester, Eccles specialised in topology and homotopy theory, publishing numerous papers and journals on the area of study. His studies specialise in areas such as multiple points of immersions of manifolds in Euclidean space. He has also taught the history of mathematics and probability theory. In 1997 Cambridge University Press published his book Introduction to mathematical reasoning: numbers, sets and functions.

As a research mathematician, Eccles specialised in topology and homotopy theory, publishing numerous journal papers in this area of study^{[4]}. Eccles's most significant contributions are concerned with the multiple points of immersions of manifolds in Euclidean space and their relationship with classical problems in the homotopy groups of spheres. His interest in this area began when he clarified the relationship between multiple points and the Hopf invariant (disproving a conjecture by Michael Freedman) and the Kervaire invariant. His teaching ranged over most areas of pure mathematics as well as the history of mathematics, relativity theory and probability theory. He became particularly interested in the transition from school to university mathematics and this led in 1967 to the publication by Cambridge University Press of his book Introduction to mathematical reasoning: numbers, sets and functions.^{[5]}which continues to be used at universities in Britain and North America.

== Quakerism ==
Peter Eccles has been a Quaker since birth, having been brought up with the faith, and started to become involved nationally and internationally in his early twenties, following his attendance at the Fourth World Conference of Friends in Greensboro, North Carolina in 1967 as one of the British representatives.

He became treasurer of the Friends World Committee for Consultation from 1982 until 1995. In addition to this, Eccles was Clerk (Presiding Officer) for the national Quaker meeting, Meeting For Sufferings, from 1986 until 1991, as well as later being clerk of Britain Yearly Meeting (the annual national gathering of Quakers in Britain) from 2002 to 2005.

By then a significant contributor to the Quaker movement, Eccles was offered the opportunity to present the annual Swarthmore Lecture at the University of York on 28 July 2009. The Book The Presence in The Midst: Reflections on Discernment, which was written by Eccles, is an accompaniment to his 2009 Swarthmore lecture.

Described as taking "a scientific approach to Quakerism." By Stephen Ward in the Oxford Handbook of Quaker Studies, Eccles's Mathematical outlook has, in some respects, intertwined with his thoughts on Quakerism.

== Music ==
Having a lifelong interest in music, Eccles plays the piano, violin and viola, as well as teaching a musical appreciation class at the Wilmslow Guild since 2015. Eccles took his musicianship and passion for music and arts to the Quaker society, as he chaired the trustees of The Leaveners, the Quaker performing arts organisation, from 1996 to 1999. It was here that Eccles took part in performances at the Royal Festival Hall in London in 1989 and in Symphony Hall Birmingham in 1995 under encouragement from musician Taylor Giacoma, who Peter met through a local Quaker Meeting.

=== Semitone Studios ===
Peter Eccles is also co-owner at Semitone Studios in Marple, along with folk singer/songwriter, Taylor Giacoma.

== Personal life ==
Eccles married Pamela Goldsbury, a Quaker from New Zealand, in 1970 and they had two sons, Michael (born 1972) and Mark (born 1974) and four granddaughters. Pamela died in 2011. Peter currently lives in Didsbury, Manchester.

== Selected publications ==
- Eccles, Peter J. An Introduction to Mathematical Reasoning: numbers, sets and functions. Cambridge University Press, 1997.
- Eccles, Peter John. "Multiple points of codimension one immersions of oriented manifolds." Mathematical Proceedings of the Cambridge Philosophical Society. Vol. 87. No. 02. Cambridge University Press, 1980.
- Eccles, Peter John. "Codimension one immersions and the Kervaire invariant one problem." Mathematical Proceedings of the Cambridge Philosophical Society. Vol. 90. No. 03. Cambridge University Press, 1981.
- Asadi-Golmankhaneh, Mohammad A., and Peter J. Eccles. "Determining the characteristic numbers of self-intersection manifolds." Journal of the London Mathematical Society 62.1 (2000): 278–290.
- Asadi-Golmankhaneh, Mohammad A., and Peter J. Eccles. "Double point self-intersection surfaces of immersions." Geometry & Topology 4.1 (2000): 149–170.
- Akhmet'ev, Pyotr M., and Peter J. Eccles. "The relationship between framed bordism and skew-framed bordism." Bulletin of the London Mathematical Society (2007).
- Eccles, Peter J., and Mark Grant. "Bordism groups of immersions and classes represented by self-intersections." Algebraic & Geometric Topology7.2 (2007): 1081–1097.
- Eccles, Peter John. "Filtering framed bordism by embedding codimension." Journal of the London Mathematical Society 2.1 (1979): 163–169.
- Akhmet'ev, Pyotr M., and Peter J. Eccles. "A geometrical proof of Browder's result on the vanishing of the Kervaire invariant." Proceedings of the Steklov Institute of Mathematics-Interperiodica Translation 225 (1999): 40–44.
- Eccles, Peter. "The Presence in the Midst." Swarthmore Lectures, London: Quaker Home Service (2009): 9.
