= Academy of Clinical Thyroidologists =

- Industry: Clinical medicine
- Founded: 2005
- Headquarters: Washington, DC, United States
- Key people: John Woody Sistrunk, M.D. President; Mark A. Lupo, M.D., F.A.C.E., E.C.N.U. Secretary
- Website: www.act-thyroid.com

The Academy of Clinical Thyroidologists (ACT) was founded in May 2005 at the annual meeting of the Association of Clinical Endocrinologists (AACE) in Washington, D.C. The academy is a professional society consisting of 32 members from the U.S. and Italy who specialize in clinical thyroidology. ACT encourages skill development in diagnostic and interventional ultrasound, nuclear thyroidology, and cytopathology to promote excellence in clinical practice and optimal outcomes for patients.

== Charter ==
The academy meets twice a year, and accepts board-certified new members who pledge to provide patients with state-of-the-art thyroid treatment; for example ultrasound, ultrasound guided biopsy, interventional thyroid ultrasound to treat thyroid cysts, and cancer lymph nodes with ethanol, percutaneous ethanol injections (PEI), nuclear thyroid studies, such as I/123,131 uptakes, scans, and therapy doses of I/131 for thyroid cancer, Graves' disease, toxic nodular goiter, and large obstructive nontoxic nodular goiters.

== Goals ==
Academy of Clinical Thyroidologists corroborates research and development in the field of endocrinology. The goals include:

- To certify endocrinologists in diagnostics (Ultrasound, Nuclear thyroidology and cytopathology).
- To encourage and guide endocrinologists in honing their skills.
- To conduct annual meetings to meet, share and discuss new ideas.
- To collaborate and foster with National & International organizations.
- To design new programs to train professionals in standard procedures.
