= Respect (charity) =

UK-based charity working in the domestic abuse sector

- Formation: December 4, 2000; 25 years ago
- Founded: 29 March 2011
- Type: Registered UK charity (number 1141636)
- Purpose: Domestic abuse
- Headquarters: VAI Second Floor, 200a Pentonville Road, London N1 9JP
- Region served: National
- CEO: Jo Todd CBE
- Revenue: £3,622,810
- Employees: 42
- Website: https://www.respect.org.uk/

Respect is a UK-based charity working in the domestic abuse sector. A national organisation based in London, it provides services, including helplines, for male and female perpetrators of domestic violence, for male victims of domestic violence, and for young people who are violent in the home or relationships. It provides confidential counselling to perpetrators of domestic violence as a way to promote the safety of victims. It has been described as "the main UK organisation working with domestic violence perpetrators".

== Structure ==
Respect is a membership organisation, with 42 employees and a board of 13 trustees.

== History ==
The charity grew out of an informal network of practitioners called the National Practitioners’ Network (NPN). The current company was created in March 2011.

== Campaigns ==
Together with the charity SafeLives, Respect is running a campaign called "Drive", to give one-to-one counselling to men who are deemed to be at risk of committing particularly serious domestic violence. This is being piloted in Essex, Sussex and south Wales.

In 2010, with the charity Refuge, it created a manual to help employers and human resources professionals respond to employees who are victims or perpetrators of abuse.

It began the Respect Phoneline (for male or female perpetrators of domestic violence, and for professionals whose work involves perpetrators) in 2004 and the Men's Advice Line (for male victims of domestic violence) in 2007.
