= Just for Kids Law =

- Abbreviation: JfKL
- Formation: 2006
- Founder: Aika Stephenson and Shauneen Lambe
- Type: Non-governmental organisation
- Legal status: Registered charity
- Location: London, United Kingdom
- Services: Youth advocacy, legal advice, youth opportunities support.
- Chair of the Board of Trustees: Carolyn Regan
- Chief Executive Officer: Louisa McGeehan
- Subsidiaries: Children's Rights Alliance for England
- Website: www.justforkidslaw.org

Just for Kids Law is a London-based charity which provides advocacy, legal and youth opportunities services to children and young people, as well as campaigning for wider reform to benefit children and young people living in the United Kingdom. Since its foundation in 2006 by youth justice lawyers Aika Stephenson and Shauneen Lambe, the organisation has received particular renown for its work in strategic litigation, securing significant changes to the law on issues such as the treatment of 17-year-olds in police custody, the eligibility of young migrants for student finance, the law of joint enterprise, and the disclosure of youth cautions and reprimands on DBS certificates. The organisation is also known for its approach to youth advocacy support, with an independent evaluation by the National Council for Voluntary Organisations Charities Evaluation Service noting the "numerous positive benefits" of the charity's casework model.

2015 saw the charity increase its policy and human rights monitoring capacity through a merger with the Children's Rights Alliance for England, while the organisation also set up the Youth Justice Legal Centre project to increase standards in the youth justice sector. In 2017, Just for Kids Law became the first UK charity to be awarded with a criminal legal aid contract. In 2018, the charity was named Organisation of the Year at the Howard League for Penal Reform Community Awards.
