= Rights Respecting Schools Award =

Children's rights initiative

The Rights Respecting School Award (RRSA) is an initiative run by UNICEF UK, which encourages schools to place the UN Convention on the Rights of the Child (CRC) at the heart of its ethos and curriculum. A Rights Respecting School not only teaches about children's rights; it also models rights and respect in all its relationships, whether between children or between children and adults.

== Effects of the RRSA ==
The RRSA initiative started in 2004. In autumn 2017, UNICEF said that it was working with more UK schools than almost any other organization, that 1.5 million children in the UK go to a Rights Respecting School, and that more than 4,000 schools up and down the country are working towards the award. Many schools have reported a decrease in bullying, an improvement in achievement and participation, a positive effect on attitudes and global awareness, and a more inclusive, caring school atmosphere.

Adults and young people have reported that the language of rights and responsibilities, based on the CRC, empowers them to relate to each other better and to engage in decision-making more collaboratively. The effects of the Rights Respecting School initiative can be seen not just through school councils but also through the inclusive, participative way the whole school works during lessons, meal times, play, class and through parents’ involvement.

== Required standard ==
The Award is open for all schools: nursery, primary, middle, secondary and special. For a school to receive the RRS Award, they must show evidence that they have reached the required standard in the following four categories, all of which contain elements contributing to the development of an active global citizen:

1. leadership and management for embedding the values of the CRC in the life of the school.
2. knowledge and understanding of the CRC.
3. rights respecting classrooms.
4. pupils actively participate in decision-making throughout the school.

There are two levels to the Award. Level 1 describes a school which has made good progress across four key aspects of school life: leadership and management; pupils’ knowledge and understanding of the CRC; classroom climate and culture; and pupils’ active participation in decision-making. A Level 2 is awarded to schools which demonstrate that these principles are fully embedded in the life of the school.
