= Unite for Children, Unite Against AIDS =

UNICEF campaign

Unite for Children, Unite against AIDS is a global Campaign launched by UNICEF in 2005 to raise awareness of the plight of children globally in relation to HIV and AIDS, and to spur action.

Almost every minute of every day, a child dies because of AIDS, and another two young people are infected with HIV. In 2007, 270,000 children under the age of 15 died because of AIDS. Millions more have lost their parents to the disease. HIV is increasingly a disease of the young, particularly girls. Despite the already catastrophic impacts of HIV and AIDS, worse may yet be to come.

Even so, HIV is both preventable and treatable. UNICEF’s Unite for Children, Unite against AIDS campaign has four key actions for children; Prevention of new infections, Prevention of mother-to-child transmission (PMTCT), Providing treatment for children, and Protection, care and support.

== Prevention of new infections ==
As part of a comprehensive HIV prevention response, young people need accurate and relevant information about HIV transmission and a supportive environment where they can talk openly about risk behaviour. They also need to know their HIV status. UNICEF’s goal is to reduce by 25 per cent the number of young people with HIV globally.

== Prevention of mother-to-child transmission (PMTCT) ==
Without treatment, 15–30 per cent of babies born to mothers with HIV will themselves get the virus. Around one in two infants who get HIV from their mothers and do not receive treatment die before their second birthday. Many pregnant women are still missing out on treatment. UNICEF hopes to provide services for 80 per cent of all women in need.

== Providing treatment for children ==
Only a fraction of children living with HIV receive life-saving anti-retroviral therapy (ART). Without treatment, children face a bleak and short-lived future. Current paediatric ARVs are still expensive compared to adult formulas, which are not packaged in child-friendly doses. UNICEF’s goal is to provide treatment to 80 per cent of children in need.

== Protection, care and support ==
Children who have lost one or both parents to AIDS face discrimination and stigmatisation. Those living in households with ill or dying parents are often even more vulnerable. Parents with HIV need to be provided with treatment to prevent orphanhood. All children affected by HIV and AIDS need access to health care and education, as well as protection, care and support. UNICEF’s goal is to provide services that reach 80 per cent of children most in need.

Much has been achieved in recent years. For instance:

- In 2004, only one in 10 pregnant women with HIV in low and middle-income countries received anti-retroviral medicine. Today, one in three receive medicine.
- In 2005, only 75,000 children with HIV received treatment. Today, nearly 200,000 children receive life-saving medicine.
- There has been a decline in HIV prevalence among pregnant women age 15–24 attending antenatal clinics in 14 of the 17 worst-affected countries (with sufficient data).
- Increased efforts to protect, care and support children affected by HIV and AIDS.

Despite these achievements, much remains to be done. The protection, prevention, treatment and support for children affected by HIV and AIDS remains insufficient.

== We want to live free from HIV ==
In May 2009, UNICEF UK launched a new phase of the 'Unite for Children, Unite against AIDS' campaign. Focused on preventing infection among adolescents and young people, this campaign is called ‘We want to live free from HIV’. It follows UNICEF UK’s ‘Born Free from HIV’ campaign, which concentrated on the issue of preventing mother-to-child transmission of HIV.

In 2008, it was estimated that young people aged 15 to 24 accounted for an estimated 45 per cent of new HIV infections worldwide and that almost two young people acquire HIV every minute. On average, only 30 per cent of young men and 19 per cent of young women in developing countries have comprehensive and correct knowledge about HIV and how to avoid transmission. Not enough attention is being given to preventing HIV spreading further among young people around the world.

UNICEF UK’s ‘We want to live free from HIV’ campaign aims to raise over £2 million for HIV and AIDS and to remind governments of the importance of effective HIV prevention amongst young people.
