= SafeLives =

UK-based charity

SafeLives is a UK-based charity working in the area of domestic violence. It was founded by Diana Barran, who served as its chief executive from 2004 to 2017. Barran was succeeded as chief executive by Suzanne Jacob. The charity has worked in partnership with other violence/domestic violence charities including Leap Confronting Conflict and Respect. Following the 2018 conviction of Stephen Searle for the murder of Anne Searle, SafeLives criticised the BBC’s coverage of domestic violence, arguing that it contained "victim-blaming stereotypes".
