= Dev Sharma =

British activist

Member of the UK Youth Parliament

Personal details
- Education: Rushey Mead School; Winchester College
- Alma mater: University of Cambridge
- Occupation: Activist/Youth politician

Dev Sharma is a British-Indian food activist, a founding youth campaigner at Bite Back 2030, and was a Member of Youth Parliament for Leicester and subsequently Winchester in the UK Youth Parliament. He is the chair of the UK government's first youth enquiry into the cost of living.

His work focuses on drawing attention to the impacts of big food companies on young people's health and advocating for an end to child food poverty in Britain.

== Personal life and education ==
Sharma was born in Leicester. He attended Rushey Mead Academy and later attended Winchester College. He is currently studying Human, Social & Political Sciences at Magdalene College at the University of Cambridge.

== Activism ==
Sharma is a food activist and began a campaign for the world's first total online ban in junk food marketing. He wrote an open online letter to Prime Minister Boris Johnson asking that young people in his community could select the kind of food to eat without the nonstop corporate pressure. The campaign was accelerated by a digital email action which sent an email to the Prime Minister anytime the letter was signed, leading to meetings with members of the government and an invite to 10 Downing Street. His campaign was supported by numerous celebrities and was included by the government in the Queen's speech.

Sharma has campaigned on food poverty since age 14 when he delivered a food charter to 10 Downing Street alongside Dame Emma Thompson. During the COVID pandemic, Sharma was part of the campaign to feed disadvantaged children who were entitled to school meals free of charge in term time but not provided for in the summer holiday and so at risk of hunger. This campaign was given a high-profile by footballer Marcus Rashford and as a result the UK government changed its policy in 2020. He has continued to meet with a number of key cabinet ministers and Prime Minister Keir Starmer.

Sharma joined leaders from the UK's largest health charities and medical organisations to issue a warning to the Prime Minister in 2022, urging Boris Johnson not to dilute new laws which could prevent thousands of children from developing overweight and obesity.

In 2024, Sharma was made chair of the UK Government's Youth Select Committee which conducted the first full and comprehensive review on the rising cost of living's impact on young people. The Committee heard evidence from government ministers, charity leaders and young people from inside a Committee Room in Parliament, which is normally reserved for MPs. The inquiry's recommendation on equalising the National Living Wage was formally accepted by the UK Government and welcomed by the Department for Business and Trade and Department for Work and Pensions.

Sharma supports the “Say Yes to School Food For All” campaign, and in November 2023 called on Rishi Sunak to ensure young people have access to free school meals.

Sharma has spoken at several conferences around the world, including the Consumer Goods Forum, COP26, the UN Food Systems Summit, the UCL, Global Obesity Summit, and the British House of Lords and House of Commons. He is in a small group of non-MPs to speaks at the despatch box in the House of Commons when he delivered a speech in 2023. The sitting was chaired by the Speaker of the House, Sir Lindsay Hoyle MP, and was broadcast via BBC Parliament and inscribed to Hansard. He delivered a second speech in the House of Commons in 2024 on food poverty.

He is an ambassador for the Food Foundation and its Children's Right2Food Initiative. He is on the advisory board for the EAT Foundation.

== Bite Back 2030 ==
In 2019, Sharma was a founding campaigner of Bite Back 2030 alongside other co-founders like celebrity chef, Jamie Oliver. Bite Back is a youth activist movement which aims to change government policy and business regulation to protect children's health. Sharma chaired Bite Back.

== Awards ==
Sharma was awarded the Diana Award, by Prince Harry the Duke of Sussex, for his food activism. The Diana Award is considered the most prestigious accolade a young person can receive for humanitarian work.

In 2022, the Speaker of the House Sir Lindsay Hoyle awarded him a UK Parliament award for Volunteer of the Year.

Sharma switched on Leicester's Diwali Lights, the largest Diwali celebration outside of India.
