= Bite The Ballot =

- Founded: 2010, Dartford, United Kingdom
- Location: London, United Kingdom
- Region served: United Kingdom
- Method: Online mobilisation, grassroots organising, policy making
- Key people: Michael Sani (Chief Executive) Kenny Imafidon (Partnerships and Research Coordinator)
- Website: bitetheballot.co.uk

Bite The Ballot (BTB) is a party-neutral movement and registered youth democracy charity, based in the United Kingdom. Its mission is to empower young people to evolve UK democracy.

BTB was formed in April 2010 by business studies teachers David Hughesman and Michael Sani, along with other staff and students, at Wilmington Enterprise College in Dartford. As a youth-led project, the students' mission was to rebrand politics and prove that young people do care about improving democracy.

== History ==
=== 2010 ===
Bite The Ballot was founded in 2010 by current CEO Michael Sani and David Hughesman, both teachers at Wilmington Enterprise College in Dartford. They produced a short documentary to tackle the idea young people are apathetic when it comes to politics, which was promoted by the NUS.

=== 2011 ===
Whilst still teaching at Wilmington Enterprise College, Sani and Hughesman worked on a government pilot to create games and resources to encourage voter registration. The scheme was trialled in 20 schools across the country, laying the foundations for the games which serve as Bite The Ballot's key educational initiatives such as 'The Basics'.

=== 2012 ===
In April 2012, Bite The Ballot organised the UK's first youth voter registration rally, held at the Ministry of Sound, in collaboration with UpRise, Reprezent Radio, Spirit of London Awards and The Media Trust.

The organisation also launched 'Inspired Impressions' - a UK-based art competition, with the winning pieces were displayed in the Houses of Parliament. 'Rock Enrol' was also introduced this year. The pilot scheme with the Cabinet Office's Democratic Engagement Team was designed to develop political literacy and inspire young people to engage in political debate. This later developed into the Ofsted-recommended scheme 'The Basics' - delivered to more than 450 schools across the UK.

=== 2013 ===
In 2013, Bite The Ballot launched 'My Manifesto' - a project designed to champion issues young people deemed significant. It was a collection of youth voice - policy propositions, statistics, figures and suggestions for government officials - that was presented to parliament at a launch event.

=== 2014 ===
Bite The Ballot won the European Charlemagne Youth Prize in the start of 2014, for the Impressions Art Project run in 2012. In February, Bite The Ballot organised the UK's first National Voter Registration Drive (NVRD), held on 5 February 2014 - the anniversary of the Reform Act 1832. An estimated 50,000 people were registered in one day.

Later in 2014, Bite The Ballot launched '#TheAmendment' to improve voter registration and engagement in Wales. Its aims were to get Electoral Registration Officers to target groups seen as less likely to register to vote, have voter registration sessions in schools and colleges, and to make registering to vote as simple and straightforward as possible.

On 24 September 2014, Members of the Welsh Assembly voted in favour of #TheAmendment. As the Welsh Assembly cannot make decisions about voting policy, a petition was delivered to Westminster.

In November 2015, Bite The Ballot partnered with Twitter and ITV to hold the first 'Leaders Live' sessions. These were live interviews and Q&A sessions with four of the five main party leaders at the time: An online campaign was sparked after Downing Street confirmed that Prime Minister David Cameron, who had originally agreed to take part, would not be attending.

=== 2015 ===
The second NVRD took place, with Bite The Ballot registering 441,696 people, a record, per capita, for a voting registration drive in the western world.

To coincide with the 2015 United Kingdom general election, Bite The Ballot launched Verto, its gamified voting advice application.

=== 2016 ===
Verto is relaunched in April to coincide with the London mayoral and assembly elections.

In collaboration with HOPE not hate, Bite The Ballot launched its '#TurnUp' campaign, encouraging young citizen to register and vote in the EU Referendum that took place on 23 June.

Alongside this, Bite The Ballot also published the first ever letter of its kind to receive cross party support from political leaders past and present, calling for increased political education. Its signatories included former Prime Minister Gordon Brown of the Labour Party, former Deputy Prime Minister Nick Clegg MP, and current leader of the Green Party Natalie Bennett.

== National Voter Registration Day (UK) ==
Inspired by the USA's Rock The Vote, Bite The Ballot created and launched the UK's first National Voter Registration Day. The inaugural National Voter Registration Day was held on 5 February 2014, as this is the anniversary of the Great Reform Act 1832. The inaugural year saw an estimated 50,000 people registered to vote. During the week of 2–8 February 2015, 441,500 people registered to vote, including 166,000 on 5 February 2015 alone.

== Leaders Live ==
Bite The Ballot created the first live-streamed policy Q&A sessions with the main political party leaders. The project was partnered by ITV News and Twitter UK.

The interviews took place over a six-week period in late 2014:

- Natalie Bennett the Green Party of England and Wales – 26 November 2014
- Nigel Farage MEP UK Independence Party – 2 December 2014
- Ed Miliband MP Labour Party (UK) – 8 December 2014
- Nick Clegg MP Liberal Democrats – 16 December 2014

=== Leaders Live Controversy & Leaders Pledges ===
Nigel Farage MEP made a series of comments contradicting existing UKIP policy on sex and relationships education during the live debate. Ed Miliband MP pledged to give 16- and 17-year-olds the right to vote from May 2016. In January 2015, Bite The Ballot received confirmation from 10 Downing Street that David Cameron MP would not be taking part in Leaders Live sparking a campaign calling for the Prime Minister to reconsider.

== Verto ==
In 2015, Bite the Ballot launched voter advice tool, Verto. The app was released to coincide with the 2015 general election, to determine which party a user's views align most closely with. Developed in collaboration with think-tank Demos, the Political Studies Association, and a range of academics, Verto reached over 400,000 users - 40% of whom were aged between 18 and 25.

In April 2016, Verto.London was launched to coincide with the 2016 London Mayoral election.

== #TurnUp ==
In 2016 Bite The Ballot partnered with the anti-hate organisation Hope not Hate for their #TurnUp campaign, aiming to inspire 500,000 young people to register to vote and participate in the EU Referendum on 23 June 2016. By the end of the registration period (the initial deadline of 7 June was extended by 48 hours following on from technical faults), more than 1.1 million young people registered to vote during the week-long #TurnUp campaign.

The then-Prime Minister David Cameron backed Bite The Ballot in the days leading up to the referendum registration deadline on 7 June to encourage young people to register to vote. The campaign was promoted across social media, as well as through partnerships with apps such Tinder, Uber and Deliveroo.

On 5 June 2016, Bite The Ballot hosted a live-streamed debate on the referendum. Featuring a panel of 'idols and influencers' including Bob Geldof and Katie Hopkins, the #InOutLive debate discussed the central issues of the referendum.

== Celebrity endorsement ==
Jamal Edwards, founder of SB.TV, is a long-standing Bite The Ballot ambassador backing the cause on numerous occasions. Other notable supporters include Laura Whitmore, Eliza Doolittle (singer) and Max Rushden. Presenter Rick Edwards hosted the first two Leaders Live shows and has worked on a joint crowd funding project to raise funds for Bite The Ballot's voting advice application. YouTuber creators such as JacksGap and Rebecca Jane Brown have also played a key role in inspiring youth engagement with Bite The Ballot.

== See also ==
- Elections in the United Kingdom
- List of political parties in the United Kingdom
- Politics of the United Kingdom
- Youth engagement
