= The Leaveners =

The Leaveners was a performing arts organisation consisting of members of the Religious Society of Friends (Quakers).

They started at Britain Yearly Meeting in 1978. They run a number of projects, most specifically for young people, some resulting in a performance. The Leaveners is a member of The National Council for Voluntary Youth Services (NCVYS).

The organisation closed in 2017 after the core funder withdrew.

== Groups ==
The Leaveners work falls into three areas: Quaker Youth Theatre, Quaker Music Making and Words, Signs & Vibes. Although The Leaveners are one organisation, they often work as individual groups; most of their larger projects involve more than one of these groups and many participants are involved in more than one of the groups.

=== Quaker Youth Theatre ===
Quaker Youth Theatre (QYT) is the longest running project of The Leaveners, and began in 1978 with a street theatre performance at Britain Yearly Meeting. From these roots, they have grown into running week-long projects producing a single piece of amateur theatre. Primarily based in Birmingham, they have put on plays in the Crescent Theatre, as well as in meeting houses across Britain.

=== Quaker Music Making ===
In addition to annual projects, The Leaveners also offer singing workshops to Quaker Meetings. Although some projects require musical proficiency, they also changed their name to Quaker Music Making, from Quaker Festival Orchestra and Chorus in 1997.

=== Words, Signs & Vibes ===
Words, Signs & Vibes (W,S&V) works with deaf, partially hearing and hearing young people, both Quaker and non-Quaker. They run a weekly drama group for young people, and also hold 1 or 2 week-long projects each year, usually during school holidays.

Words, Signs & Vibes separated from the Leaveners in July 2008 and has since become an Independent Voluntary Organisation.

== LEAP ==
Leaveners' Experiments in Arts for Peace was created as part of the Leaveners, but became an independent organisation in 1999.

== Patrons ==
As a charity, the Leaveners were supported by donations from its participants, families thereof, monthly meetings and its patrons:

- Judi Dench
- Sheila Hancock
- Ben Kingsley
- John Whitney
- Anna Wing
