= Welsh Youth Parliament =

Youth model legislature

- Senedd Ieuenctid Cymru
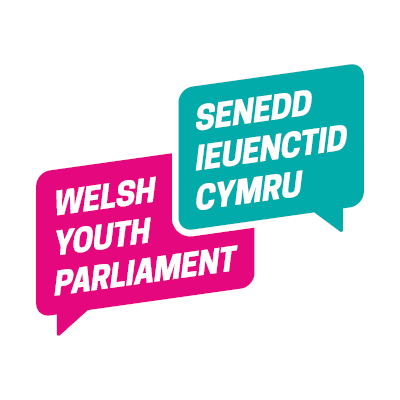
- Logo of the Welsh Youth Parliament

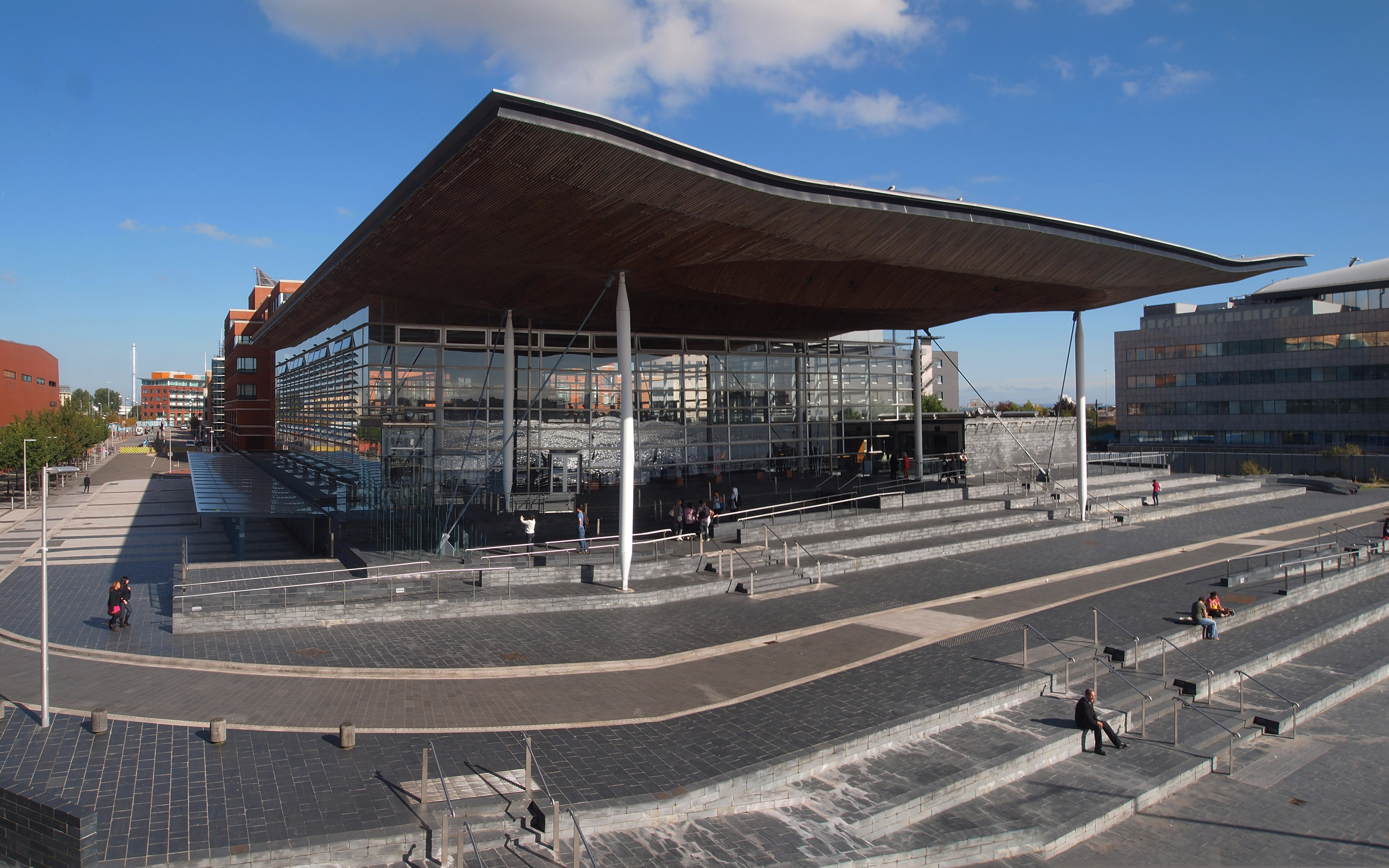
- The Senedd building in Cardiff Bay

- The location of the Senedd in Cardiff, Wales
- Abbreviation: WYP/SIC
- Formation: 5 December 2018
- Founded at: Senedd building, Cardiff
- Type: Voluntary simulated unicameral legislature
- Location: Cardiff, Wales
- Coordinates: 51°27′50″N 3°9′43″W
- Region served: Wales
- Fields: Youth empowerment Legislative simulation
- Members: 60 (2018-Present)
- Official language: Welsh; English
- Parent organization: Senedd
- Budget: £100K
- Website: youthparliament.senedd.wales

The Welsh Youth Parliament (WYP) (Welsh: Senedd Ieuenctid Cymru (SIC)) is a youth model legislature established in 2018 by the Senedd (then the National Assembly for Wales).

It states that its purpose is to empower young people to make decisions and to provide them with a voice in Welsh politics.

== Background ==
The WYP was formed in December 2018 and consists of sixty members of 11 to 18 year olds.

Forty members were elected in an electronic election using the Senedd constituencies and twenty further members were chosen by partner organisations. The young people are known as Members of the Welsh Youth Parliament (WYPMs).

All sixty members of the Parliament meet nationally, over a total of three occasions, during their two-year term. The organisation meets at the Senedd building in Cardiff Bay.

The first meeting of all members took place in February 2019. In addition the members meet in regional meetings to continue their work programme; which are held in the four electoral regions of Wales - Mid & West Wales, North Wales, South-East Wales and South-West Wales. Three regional events are also held over the two-year term where young people from all over Wales can meet with their elected representatives and have their views heard.

== Partner organisations ==
At its inception, youth organisations across Wales were invited to apply to be partner organisations for the inaugural Parliament. Those who were chosen returned between one and three members each to represent them, coming from a diverse range of people in Wales.

Partner organisations of the Welsh Youth Parliament include:

- Action for Children
- Carers Trust
- Conwy Youth Service
- Digon
- EYST
- Girlguiding Wales
- GISDA
- Learning Disability Wales
- Llamau (charity)
- National Youth Advocacy Service
- Race Council Cymru
- Stephens and George Centenary Charitable Trust
- Swansea Council
- Talking Hands
- TGP Wales
- Hope House & Ty Hafan
- Urdd
- Voices from Care Cymru
- Youth Engagement and Participation Service
- Young Farmers Wales

== See also ==
- UK Youth Parliament
- Funky Dragon
