= S1 MP3 player =

Generic type of digital audio player based on Actions Semiconductor chipsets

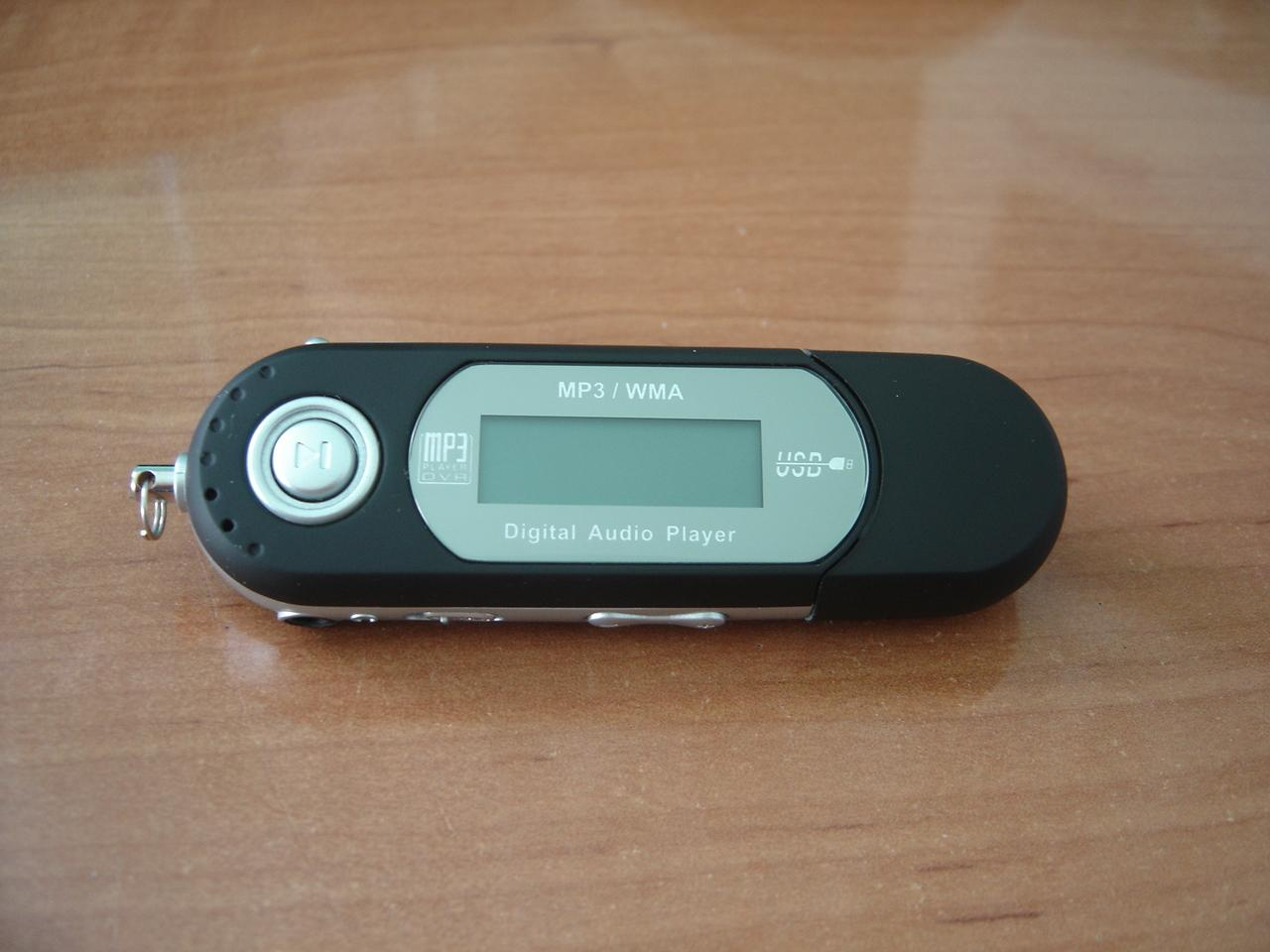
- A typical S1-based MP3 player
- Developer: Various manufacturers
- Type: Digital audio player
- Storage: Flash memory (64 MB – 2 GB), some with microSD
- Display: LCD or OLED
- Connectivity: USB 1.1/2.0
- Power: Internal Li-ion battery or AAA

The S1 MP3 player is a portable audio player that was sold under a wide variety of brands during the early 2000s. Widely manufactured in China, S1-based players were known for their low cost, simple interfaces, and widespread rebranding. They became a popular entry-level option during the early years of portable digital music.

== Overview ==
S1 players were based on the Actions ATJ20xx chip family and typically supported MP3 and WMA audio playback. Most models also included an FM radio, voice recording, basic e-book reading, and acted as USB flash drives. Despite varying external designs, many shared the same internal architecture, leading to common firmware layouts across brands.

S1 players were not associated with a single company. Instead, the hardware was licensed and manufactured by various OEMs and rebranded for distribution. Names include Aigo, Mpio, MPman, Nextar, Maxfield, Centon and countless unbranded models sold online and in discount electronics stores.

== Features ==
Common features of S1 MP3 players included:

- Audio support for MP3, WMA, and sometimes WAV (but it wont show up in the mp3 players built in file browser)
- Monochrome or OLED screen for menu and ID3 tag display
- Flash memory storage ranging from 64 MB to 2 GB
- USB 2.0 plug for file transfer and charging
- Built-in FM radio (on many models)
- Voice recording via onboard microphone
- Text (.txt) e-book viewing
- Rechargeable lithium-ion battery or removable AAA battery
- Basic equalizer settings and folder browsing

== Firmware and software ==
Due to the shared S1 chipset, these players often ran similar firmware. Enthusiast websites such as s1mp3.org provided tools for:

- Extracting and editing firmware
- Recovering "bricked" devices
- Replacing language packs and icons

However, firmware compatibility was inconsistent, and flashing the wrong version often rendered devices unusable. Some knockoff devices also falsely reported storage capacity, a common scam issue with clone firmware.

== Market impact ==
Between 2004 and 2008, S1 MP3 players offered one of the cheapest portable media options on the market. Devices were often sold for under US$20 and were popular among students, travelers, and users in developing countries.

Their compact design and plug-and-play functionality also made them popular as corporate promotional items and portable audio tools for language learning or audiobooks.

== Limitations and criticism ==
While affordable, S1 players were often criticized for:

- Inconsistent build and audio quality
- Misrepresented storage capacity
- Poor user manuals and lack of support
- Low-resolution displays and clunky UI
- Fragile internal connectors and buttons

Some models also came with preloaded software or files that raised malware concerns.

== Legacy ==
Though no longer produced or supported, S1 MP3 players are remembered as a transitional technology in the evolution of portable audio. Their hacker-friendly architecture made them a subject of reverse engineering and hobbyist firmware development. Some devices remain in use today or circulate among retro tech collectors.

== See also ==
- Portable media player
- Digital audio player
- MP3
- Flash memory
- Rockbox
