= NAHT Edge =

- Founded: September 2014
- Headquarters: Haywards Heath, England
- Location: United Kingdom
- Members: Unconfirmed
- Key people: James Bowen, NAHT Edge Director
- Affiliations: TUC
- Website: www.nahtedge.org.uk

NAHT Edge is a trade union and professional association delivered by NAHT for middle leaders (for example, heads of department, heads of year and SENCos) in schools. NAHT Edge has members throughout England, Wales and Northern Ireland, and from across the three main stages: early, primary and secondary. NAHT Edge, as part of NAHT, affiliated to the TUC in 2014.

== Governance and administration ==
NAHT Edge is advised by its Advisory Council, which consists of seven NAHT Edge members and the NAHT Edge CEO. The Advisory Council will be elected every two years. If Advisory Council members want to continue in the role following their two-year term, they'll need to be re-elected. Members can serve a maximum of two terms.

== History ==
NAHT members overwhelmingly approved its concept at a special general meeting in late 2013.

It was officially announced at NAHT's annual conference in May 2014 and launched in September that year.

NAHT Edge, as part of NAHT, affiliated to the TUC in 2014.

== See also ==
- Education in the United Kingdom
