= Thyroidologist =

A thyroidologist is a medical practitioner specializing in the thyroid and related areas.

In the United States it refers to a board certified endocrinologist physician, who is either a full time academic with multiple responsibilities beside thyroid patient care, or a clinical thyroidologist. A clinical thyroidologist is a board certified endocrinologist, who cares for a majority of thyroid patients, with few patients experiencing other endocrine conditions. In many European countries, not only endocrinologists, but also nuclear medicine specialists work as clinical thyroidologists focusing on diagnosis and treatment of thyroid disease.

The American Association of Clinical Endocrinologists (AACE) developed the Endocrine Certification in Neck Ultrasound (ECNU) program. ECNU is a professional certification in the field of neck ultrasonography for Endocrinologists, Thyroidologists, and Thyroidology practices. Those certified in the field perform consultations and diagnostic evaluations for thyroid and parathyroid disorders through both diagnostic ultrasound and ultrasound-guided fine needle aspiration (UGFNA). These clinical thyroidologists also take on the role of interventional thyroid radiologists, and specialize in non-surgical procedures such as ablation therapy for thyroid and parathyroid cysts and recurrent neck thyroid cancer lymph nodes.

Physicians and medical practitioners who hold the ECNU professional certification are highly specialized thyroidologists in the field of neck ultrasonography. They perform consultations and diagnostic evaluations for thyroid and parathyroid disorders through both diagnostic ultrasound and ultrasound-guided fine needle aspiration (UGFNA).
