= Carers Trust =

UK charity

- Carers Trust logo
- Formation: 1991
- Headquarters: Carers Trust, 2-6 Boundary Row, London, SE1 8HP
- Staff: 58 (2018/19)
- Website: www.carers.org

The Carers Trust is a charity in the United Kingdom which supports carers. It works with a network of partner organisations to help carers with the challenges of their caring roles.

== History ==
The Princess Royal Trust for Carers was created on the initiative of Anne, Princess Royal in the UK in 1991. At that time people caring at home for family members or friends with disabilities and chronic illnesses were scarcely recognised as requiring support.

The Trust was the largest provider of comprehensive carers support services in the UK. Through its unique network of 144 independently managed Carers' Centres, 85 young carers services and interactive websites, The Trust provided quality information, advice and support services to over 400,000 carers, including around 25,000 young carers. In recognition of its work for the welfare and development of young people, the Trust was a member of The National Council for Voluntary Youth Services (NCVYS).

In 2012, the organisation merged with Crossroads Care to form the Carers Trust.

== See also ==
- Caregiver
- Department of Health and Social Care
- Department for Work and Pensions
- Department for Children, Schools and Families
