= Rebecca Jane Brown =

British vlogger

Rebecca Jane Brown (born 4 December 1992) is an English vlogger, artist and YouTube personality. She has posted content about trichotillomania and was nominated for Mind's Digital Media Award.

== Biography ==
Brown was born on 4 December 1992 in Chelmsford, Essex, England. She has been active on YouTube since 2006 when she started videoblogging at the age of 13, under the name Beckie0. She attended METFilm school in London from 2012 to 2014.

In 2008, Beckie started posting content about her body focused repetitive behaviour disorder, trichotillomania, which causes a compulsive need to pull out hair. In 2011, Beckie Jane Brown was nominated for Mind's Digital Media Award for her online work, and won The Speaking Out Award. She has appeared on the BBC to discuss trichotillomania, and her most popular video to date is a montage of photos of her face which she has taken daily since the age of 14. In 2017, Marie Claire named her one of the best accounts to follow for mental health.

Brown spoke out against YouTube's decision to change their monetisation criteria in January 2018.
