= Funky Dragon =

Welsh young people assembly (2004–2014)

Logo of Funky Dragon

Funky Dragon (Welsh: Draig Ffynci) was a children and young people's assembly for Wales. It was a peer-led organisation that provided opportunities for young people up to the age of 25 to have their voices heard on issues that affected them.

It worked closely with the Welsh Government and youth forums run by unitary authorities, enabling it to influence decision making at different political levels.

Funky Dragon closed in 2014. A Welsh Youth Parliament was established in 2018.

== Mission statement ==
Funky Dragon was a peer-led organisation. It aimed to give 0 to 25-year-olds the opportunity to get their voices heard on issues that affect them. It was created by young people of Wales and the Welsh Government in order to help under-25s in Wales attain their rights under Article 12 of the UNCRC. Funky Dragon's main tasks were to make sure that the views of children and young people are heard, particularly by the Welsh Assembly Government, and to support participation in decision-making at national level.

== Structure ==
=== Grand Council ===
The Grand Council was the main body of Funky Dragon, and comprised 100 young people: 4 from each of the 22 unitary authorities in Wales and 12 co-option seats for other organisations. The co-option seats were available for election at Funky Dragon's annual general meeting, usually held in July. The seats were detailed as follows. Members of the grand council are also elected onto the management committee where a chair was elected.

=== Local Authority Wide Forums ===
Statutory Sector – 22 places. Voluntary Sector – 22 places. School Councils – 22 places. Equality – 22 places. (Per Local Authority)

The term local authority-wide forum is used as some forums representing the geographical area of a local authority are either independent or are supported by an agency other than the Local Authority such as the Prince's Trust or the Children's Society.

Each Local Authority Wide Forum was offered four places for young people. See above for the breakdown. It was up to each forum to democratically elect their representatives. Representatives were asked to commit to a 2-year term with the Grand Council.

Each Local Authority Wide Forum was responsible for carrying out its own election process. The only conditions Funky Dragon put on the process are:

- The young people involved are aged between 11 and 25
- The election must be a fair and democratic process
- Only young people are able to vote
- One young person should represent the statutory sector e.g. youth clubs, social services etc.
- One young person should represent the voluntary sector e.g. local charities, uniformed group, young farmers etc.
- One young person should represent the local school councils.
- One young person should represent young people from specific interest groups.

These are:

- Lesbian, gay, bisexual and transgender
- Disability
- Young careers
- Looked after
- Black and minority ethnic
- Homeless
- Been in the juvenile justice system
- Long-term health problems (not disabled)

== AGM ==
Every year Grand Council representatives got the chance to meet with Welsh Ministers to question them on issues that are affecting young people across Wales. During the meetings, the young people were able to follow up on any issues talked of in a previous meeting and use the time to get to know the Ministers better.

The questions were decided by the grand council, youth forums, specific interest groups and any other groups of young people wishing to ask a question and get an answer from Assembly Members.

Past Ministers who have attended the meetings include Jane Davidson, Minister for Education Lifelong Learning and Skills and Jane Hutt, Minister for Assembly Business Equalities and Children

The Funky Dragon AGM happened once a year in the Senedd building in Cardiff Bay.

The Grand Council and young people from across Wales were able to come together and discuss their views/opinions and then question Ministers during Question Time. The Grand Council members met Ministers and officials to discuss how young people from all over Wales could effect change at a national level.

Time was then spent in the Senedd chamber to complete elections, declaration of accounts and any other business.

Funky Dragon had become known for its 'Funky Dragon does the Oscars' evening award ceremony, recognizing the hard work and achievements of the Grand Council representatives

=== Sub-Groups ===
Each of the Sub-Groups has an Assembly Member responsible for the development of every area - included here are articles, reports, documents, proposals, committee minutes for each sub-group area.

- Minister for Education, Lifelong Learning and Skills:
- Minister for Sustainable Development and Planning:
- Minister for Culture, Welsh Language and Sport:
- Minister for Health and Social Care:
- Minister for Social Justice and Regeneration:
- Minister for Enterprise, Innovations and Networks:
- Minister for Finance, Local Government and Public Services:

Each Sub-Group area had 2 Grand Council representatives as Co-Chairs within Funky Dragon, and it is their duty to take forward the ideas discussed throughout the year at Grand Council residentials and the Annual General Meeting (AGM).

== Our Rights Our Story (OROS) ==
Our Rights Our Story is a report which was written by a steering group on behalf of the grand council. It was to inform the United Nations Convention on the Rights of a Child, how the rights of children in Wales are granted.

In February 2006 Funky Dragon received funding to carry out the biggest piece of research into the views of young people in Wales. The project was steered by Grand Council members from Funky Dragon who were involved in developing the questions and activities, recruiting staff and analysing the results of the work.

The views of over 12,000 young people were gathered through a national survey, workshops and interviews with special interest groups, and additional funding was received earlier this year for extra research into the views of over 2,500 children aged 7–10 (a separate report, Why do people's ages go up not down? was produced).

Our Rights, Our Story focused on specific areas of children's rights

•Education •Health •Information •Participation •Special Interest Groups Key findings identified by the children and young people included:

•Increasing children and young people's awareness that they have rights •The need for schools to offer guidance and support for young people to help them develop their opinions •Being listened to more by the government •For under 11's to have a greater say in decisions affecting them. ‘Our Rights, Our Story’ has been submitted to the UNCRC in June 2008, alongside the Welsh Assembly Government report and the alternative NGO report, Stop, look, listen. more information can be found on the funky dragon website

== Funding and end ==
Funky Dragon received its core funding from the Welsh government from its creation in 2002 until its end in 2014. In its last complete financial year, it received £418,000 from the Welsh government, £326,000 from the European Union and smaller amounts from other sources. In 2014, Funky Dragon were asked to apply for funding through the Children and Families Delivery Grant but this agency turned them down. Despite protests, Funky Dragon had to close down in 2014.
