= The Act (video game) =

2007 video game

- Developers: Cecropia; React Entertainment (iOS ver.)
- Publishers: Cecropia; Chillingo (iOS ver.)
- Director: Omar Khudari
- Platforms: Arcade, iOS
- Release: Arcade; 2007 iOS; June 21, 2012
- Genre: Interactive movie
- Mode: Single player

The Act is an interactive movie arcade video game originally produced by American studio Cecropia in the United States in 2007. The game is an interactive cartoon featuring the hand-drawn art of a number of former Disney animators. It was test marketed in selected locations throughout North America in 2006, and it received generally favorable press coverage. The game was cancelled in late 2007, and Cecropia shut its doors in early 2008. The game was later ported to iOS and OS X by React Entertainment and published by Chillingo in June 2012.

== Plot ==
The Act tells the story of Edgar, who works as a window washer at a large hospital. He sees Sylvia, a nurse, through a window and quickly falls in love, but is forced to get back to work when his boss comes out to check up on him. His lazy brother, Wally, climbs through a window into a patient's room and falls asleep in his bed, and is mistakenly taken to an operating room for a brain transplant. In an effort to save his brother, Edgar sneaks into the hospital disguised as a doctor, runs into Sylvia and tries to impress her while taking care of a number of patients.

He eventually runs into his boss, who accidentally chokes on his cigar in surprise, forcing Edgar to save his life by using the Heimlich maneuver. Edgar is forced to reveal his true identity as a simple window washer to Sylvia and is dragged away by a security guard. Seeing his brother about to be operated upon, Edgar breaks into the operating room and quickly takes Wally back to the patient's room, where the correct patient is now waiting for his operation. Edgar and Wally then return to work, but Edgar comes back into the room when he sees Sylvia crying. When he successfully consoles her with a flower, she gives the flower back to him in a sign of acceptance.

== Gameplay ==
The objective of The Act is to guide Edgar through a series of interactive scenes, each of which has a specific goal. The scenes vary in length, style and goal, but the player controls Edgar in each scene by way of a single control knob (or by swiping the touch screen in the iOS versions). In some scenes, the knob controls Edgar's level of boldness as he attempts to flirt with Sylvia or tries to fit in with a crowd, while other scenes control him more directly as he attempts to perform the Heimlich maneuver on his boss or run down a series of narrow hallways while dodging obstacles. In order to succeed, the player must observe the situation and carefully manipulate the knob in order to successfully pull off an act. For example, if Edgar acts too boldly or too shy at the wrong times during the flirting scene, Sylvia will walk off. If the player fails the scene's objective, the scene ends, then quickly rewinds back to the beginning to be played again. The player is given three attempts per credit. The game ends when the player either runs out of attempts or successfully completes the last scene.

== Development ==
The Act was originally developed for the coin-op arcade market and was test-marketed in a series of locations in the New England region. Omar Khudari, founder of development company Cecropia, had also discussed the possibility of publishing the game for download to home computers and game consoles. While the game received generally positive press reviews, publisher interest in the game failed to materialize, and the project was cancelled in early 2007. Cecropia later closed its doors in 2008.

Prior to closing, Cecropia auctioned off 10 kits of the game on eBay. The kits used were Intel-powered PCs that featured a custom made JAMMA-to-PC I/O board. Other kits that were produced (40 in total) were given to members of Cecropia's staff. Also two dedicated cabinets were sold to the public, these cabinets having been used to location test the game. Most kits ended up in the hands of private collectors while at least one ended up in an arcade in Utah.

In August 2011, the game's official website was updated with mentions of "Cecropia" changed to "React Entertainment" and the "About The Act" page described it as a game for PC and mobile devices rather than as an arcade game. In March 2012, React Entertainment announced that the game would be published by Chillingo, and shortly would be released for iPhone, iPad, and Mac, and it was finally released on June 21, 2012. It has since been delisted.

== Reception ==
GamesRadar listed the game first in their "Top 7 Most Beautifully Animated 2D Games" feature.

== See also ==
- TheActGame.com (primary website)
- React-Entertainment.com (developer website)
