= The Act (band) =

- Origin: Oslo, Norway
- Genres: Rock, new wave, power pop
- Years active: 1983–1987
- Labels: EMI Odeon; Tarted Up

The Act was a Norwegian rock band active in the mid-1980s. They toured extensively and released the album September Field.

== History ==
The Act formed under the name Wham Bam! in February 1983, after Bjørn Kulseth (b. 1962) had moved to the capital Oslo and advertised in the music paper Nye Takter for other players into late 1970s new wave and classic 1960s pop and rock.

Kulseth and Rune Krogseth (b. 1963) both sang lead and backing vocals, played guitars and wrote songs. Bass player Trond Ihlen (b. 1956) and drummer Dag Bøgeberg (b. 1957) had been kicking around the Oslo music scene since the mid-1970s. Both had been in the band Jydske Rev (one album; Nyt det in 1981) though not at the same time.

Wham Bam! quickly become a popular live act, playing both original songs and covers of artists like Elvis Costello, Nick Lowe, the Blasters, Creedence Clearwater Revival, Smokey Robinson etc. To avoid associations with the new UK teenybop duo Wham!, the band name was altered to The Act in November 1983.

After playing the Oslo club Ratz in January 1984, The Act took on keyboards and guitar player Stein Ramberg (b. 1961) as an associated member. Ramberg was a veteran of bands like Kollaps, Front Page, Saturday Cowboys and Ghostriders.

By both headlining shows around the country and supporting visiting bands like Green on Red and R.E.M., the Act built a reputation as a live band. In December 1984, they were voted "Best Unsigned Band" in the annual readers poll in the music paper Nye Takter. Wannskræk, soon to become DumDum Boys, came in fourth.

== Releases ==
In March 1985, the Act released their first record on their own label with distribution by Sonet Records. The single "Dream Talk" had been recorded in Oslo and mixed in London by engineer Steve Smith and producer Henry Padovani. Padovani had been the first guitarist in the Police and was by now the European Vice President of I.R.S. Records: The leading UK and US independent label of the time with acts like R.E.M., the Cramps, the Fleshtones, the Go-Go's, Wall of Voodoo, the Alarm, the Lords of the New Church etc.

"Dream Talk" sold well, got impressive airplay for an independent release and secured the band a coveted live spot on Zting, the only pop show on national TV. Having already been championed for some time by both of the Norwegian music papers Nye Takter and Puls, the Act now found themselves being courted by several record companies. In the spring of 1985, they signed a three-album deal with EMI and started preparing to record the first one. A number of potential producers were approached.

Drummer Dag Bøgeberg had wanted to quit because of work and family obligations, but agreed to stay on temporarily after several auditions for a replacement had proved fruitless. In June 1985, the original quartet played one of their best gigs ever as support for US band The Textones at a beach club outside Oslo.

Recording of the debut album began in August 1985 in Oslo's top studio Bel, with veteran house engineer Ingar Helgesen and US saxophone player Steve Berlin producing. Berlin had played with the LA-bands the Plugz and the Blasters and arrived in Oslo fresh from sessions with his new band Los Lobos for the milestone Paul Simon album Graceland (not released until August 1986).

It soon became obvious that the sessions could not be timed around Bøgeberg's other commitments, so about half of the drum tracks were laid down by top session player Per Hillestad (Lava, a-ha etc.) In tune with Berlin's ambitions for a professional "state-of-the-art" album, session players were also brought in for some guitar parts and only one song by Rune Krogseth ended up on the album. All in all the more upbeat and snappy side of the band - one writer had labelled them "pop 'n' roll" - was toned down in favour of their moodier, more dramatic side.

=== September Field ===
On August 31. 1985, The Act played in front of tens of thousands at Rock on the Dock, the Norwegian version of Band Aid which was held outdoors in the port of Oslo. This was their first gig with new drummer Bjørn Juliusson as an associated member (The Young Lords, Saturday Cowboys, Ghostriders, Fra Lippo Lippi, the Monroes etc.).

When the album September Field and the single "Coming Closer" were released in January 1986, the band's name had been shortened to simply Act.

Expectations were high. Both the Puls (by now called BEAT) and Nye Takter music papers had put the band on their cover and reviews were positive.

A video of "When You Find Love" had even been produced, with financial and promotional support from sponsor Levi Strauss Norway, and in February the band went to the Netherlands for ten days to play gigs and TV and radio shows.

As the Norwegian tour in support of September Field was about to start, it was discovered that the drummer Bjørn Juliusson had double booked himself.

Totto Hansen (the Monroes, Marius Müller's Funhouse etc.) stepped in on short notice and playing regularly night after night the band now got tighter than ever.

Three months after its release, September Field had sold 10,000 copies in Norway and 2,000 in Scandinavia and Benelux. In today's market this would probably have been judged a commercial success, but at the time both band and record company were disappointed. The break even point was several thousand copies above the number sold.

Norwegian music back then was irrelevant compared to today, there was hope for something happening for Act outside Norway. A representative from EMI America had come to Oslo to see the band in a showcase and a deal had recently been made with a Swedish booking company.

In June 1986, the band went to Stockholm to headline at a club and support Eldkvarn in the garden of The Museum of Modern Art.

In the fall of 1986, they started demoing new songs, determined that the next record would be built more on their live sound.

The next thing on the agenda was a two-week tour of northern Norway in December. For the most part the tour was a disaster, with gigs being postponed or cancelled while they were on the road, driving up to 12–14 hours a day in the arctic climate.

== Disbandment ==
Back in Oslo, after thawing out over Christmas, Bjørn Kulseth decided to disband and look into the possibilities of working as a solo artist.

The following year, Kulseth released the solo album Away under the project name Hi-Yo Silver! and started the roots rock band the Contenders which released three albums between 1989 and 1994.

== Band members ==
- Bjørn Kulseth – vocals, guitars
- Rune Krogseth – vocals, guitars
- Trond Ihlen – bass guitar
- Dag Bøgeberg – drums (1983–1985)

Associated members

- Stein Ramberg – keyboards & guitars (1984)
- Bjørn "Julle" Juliusson – drums (1985–1986)
- Totto Hansen – drums (1986–1987)

== Discography ==
=== Album ===
- September Field (1986), EMI Odeon

=== Singles ===
- "Dream Talk" b/w "When You Find Love" (1985), Tarted Up
- "Coming Closer" b/w "Storyteller" (1986), EMI Odeon
