= Association of Commercial Television in Europe =

Association of Commercial Television and Video on Demand Services in Europe (ACT)
- Formation: 1989
- Type: Broadcasting association
- Headquarters: Brussels, Belgium
- Members: 26 member companies
- Official language: English, French
- Website: http://www.acte.be

The Association of Commercial Television and Video on Demand Services in Europe (ACT) is a Belgian broadcasting association.
