= Scottish Youth Parliament =

Scottish youth-led, democratic organisation

- Pàrlamaid Òigridh na h-Alba

- Nickname: SYP
- Formation: 30 June 1999
- Headquarters: Edinburgh
- Location: Edinburgh, Scotland
- Fields: Youth Empowerment; Youth Representation
- Chair: Jack Anderson
- Vice-Chair: Ella Quinn
- Board of directors: Andrew Will, Jamie Dickson, Emma Henderson, Matthew Gordon and Shona Cuthbert
- Website: https://syp.org.uk

The Scottish Youth Parliament (SYP) (Scottish Gaelic: Pàrlamaid Òigridh na h-Alba) is a youth-led, democratic organisation which aims to represent the young people of Scotland.

The SYP is made up of around 166 democratically elected representatives aged 14–25 from across Scotland. Representatives are known as Members of the Scottish Youth Parliament (MSYPs). The SYP uses the Scottish Parliamentary constituency structure to elect its members, with elections generally taking place every two years - every constituency area elects two MSYPs using the Single Transferable Vote electoral system. Over 71,000 votes were cast in the 2019 SYP elections.

Around 22 MSYPs represent Voluntary Organisations such as The Boys Brigade, Scouts Scotland, LGBT Youth Scotland and Haggeye instead of constituencies. These MSYPs are directly elected by the Organisations they represent.

The SYP meets three times a year at events called sittings. These usually take place in different Scottish Local Authorities, but were held online between 2020 and 2022 due to COVID-19. SYP returned to in-person sittings in July 2022 with SYP77 being held in Cumbernauld

The four core values of the SYP are rights, democracy, inclusion and political impartiality. SYP is non-party political, which means MSYPs do not organise themselves along party lines within the Youth Parliament. All MSYPs essentially sit as independents to avoid partisan politics interfering with their representation of young people, however allegations of a "cliquey culture" and bias towards certain parties has been levied against the majority of the membership, especially the youth leadership.

== Campaigns ==
The SYP campaigns on various issues which affect Scotland's young people.

It has been an advocate for Votes at 16 since its inception in 1999 and has campaigned for it ever since, notably ensuring that Young People aged 16 and 17 could vote in the Referendum on Scottish Independence in 2014.

SYP has campaigned on a range of issues: from its campaign to achieve Equal Marriage – Love Equally - to their Young Carers Campaign – Care. Fair. Share.

SYP's 2017-18 campaign - Right Here Right Now - centred on improving the protection of young people's rights in Scotland, and was successful in securing a commitment from the First Minister, Nicola Sturgeon, that the United Nations Convention on the Rights of the Child (UNCRC) would be incorporated into Scots Law.

The Scottish Youth Parliament's 2018–2019 campaign was "All Aboard", which sought to improve young people's experiences of public transport in Scotland.

At the July 2019 Sitting of the Scottish Youth Parliament, MSYPs choose environmental protection and climate change as their next national campaign. The campaign was named "Pack it Up, Pack it In", and was formally launched in October 2019.

In October 2020, it was decided by the organisation that the next national campaign will focus on a rights-based approach to the COVID-19 Pandemic recovery in Scotland. This campaign was titled 'Bounce Back'.

In March 2022 MSYPs voted on 4 campaign priorities for the 2021-2023 membership. The four campaign priorities were; Right to Food, Climate Crisis, Educational Attainment and Drug Misuse as a Public Health Issue.

The 2021-2023 campaign priorities were followed in March 2024 with the selection of three new national campaigns for the 2023-2025 membership. The campaigns selected were "Increase mental health training and education", "Invest in and protect youth work services" and "End gender-based violence" and where selected following consultation by MSYPs with over 4000 young people from across Scotland.

== Governance ==
The Board are responsible for the strategic direction of the organisation and are officially the charity's legal custodians.

The charity is supported by a Staff Team of 12.

The current chief executive officer and company general secretary is Jamie Dunlop.

As the organisation is youth-led the chair, vice-chair and trustees are all young people. They are democratically elected during SYP's Annual General Meeting by the membership of that term. The Current Chair is Jack Anderson MSYP, and the current vice-chair is Ella Quinn MSYP. The Board of Trustees consists of the chair, vice-chair, and; Andrew Will MSYP, Jamie Dickson MSYP, Emma Henderson MSYP, Matthew Gordon MSYP and Shona Cuthbert MSYP.

Current SYP Board
Name	Constituency	Board Role
Jack Anderson MSYP	Dundee City East	Chair
Ella Quinn MSYP	Angus South	Vice-chair
Andrew Will MSYP	YMCA Scotland	Trustee
Jamie Dickson MSYP	Caithness, Sutherland and Ross	Trustee
Emma Henderson MSYP	Cunninghame North	Trustee
Matthew Gordon MSYP	Glasgow Kelvin	Trustee
Shona Cuthbert MSYP	Edinburgh Southern	Trustee

== History ==
The group has previously held meetings in the General Assembly Rooms (former temporary home of the Scottish Parliament) in Edinburgh) and also within the new Scottish Parliament building, most recently in 2024.

== Partner organisations ==
The Scottish Youth Parliament works in partnership with many other organisations, including:

- The Scottish Government
- The Scottish Parliament and its members
- Scottish local authorities
- UK Youth Parliament
- Welsh Youth Parliament
- Children and Young People's Commissioner for Scotland
- YouthLink Scotland
- Young Scot
- Together: The Scottish Alliance for Children's Rights
- Highland Youth Voice

== Chairs ==
The Chair of SYP is elected, usually annually, by MSYPs.

A normal term of service is twelve months, although some Chairs have served for longer periods of time for reasons such as a delay in the SYP elections, and some for shorter periods of time for reasons such as resignation.

The Chair of SYP is a voluntary position and is unpaid.

The chair convenes and facilitates meetings of the Board and the full Scottish Youth Parliament. They are also the primary ambassador of SYP to the public.

There have, to date, been 21 Chairs of SYP since 2000.

Number	Years of Office	Name	Constituency/Voluntary Organisation	Notes
1	2000 - 2001	Steven Jack	STUC Youth Committee	First officially noted Chair of the Scottish Youth Parliament, First of three Chairs representing a voluntary organisation
2	2001 - 2002	Katrina Greig	Hamilton North and Bellshill
3	2002 - 2004	Steven Kidd	Motherwell and Wishaw	Served two terms as Chair - first chair to do so
4	2004 - 2005	Paul Kane	Glasgow Springburn
5	2005 - 2007	Rajiv Joshi	Glasgow Govan	Served two terms as Chair
6	2007 - 2008	John Loughton	Edinburgh North and Leith	Founder and CEO of youth charity Dare2Lead, Named 'Outstanding Youth of the World' 2013, Winner of Big Brother Celebrity Hijack 2008
7	2008	Kieran Collins	Edinburgh South
8	2009	Sam Kerr	LGBT Youth Scotland	Second Chair to represent a voluntary organisation
9	2009 - 2011	Derek Couper	Livingston	Served two terms as Chair
10	2011 - 2013	Grant Costello	East Kilbride	Served two terms as chair, SNP Westminster Digital Media Manager, Stood to be the SNP's candidate in East Kilbride in the 2021 Scottish Parliament Elections
11	2013 - 2014	Kyle Thornton	Glasgow Southside	Former Conservative Councillor for Newlands/Auldburn ward on Glasgow City Council
12	2014 - 2015	Louise Cameron	Moray	First Chair to represent a constituency outwith the central belt
13	2015 - 2016	Jordan Linden	Uddingston and Bellshill	Former depute Leader of the SNP group on North Lanarkshire Council In 2022 stepped down from Council role over a series of sexual complaints, including from his time at SYP.
14	2016	Katie Burke	North East Fife
15	2016 - 2017	Terri Smith	Edinburgh Northern and Leith
16	2017 - 2018	Amy Lee Fravioli	Rutherglen	Stood in the 2019 European Elections as a Labour candidate in Scotland
17	2018 - 2019	Suki Wan	Glasgow Shettleston
18	2019 - 2020	Jack Dudgeon	Eastwood	Term as chair extended due to COVID-19 pandemic
19	2020 - 2022	Josh Kennedy	Renfrewshire North and West	Term as chair extended due to the COVID-19 pandemic
20	2022 - 2023	Sophie Reid	Girlguiding Scotland	Third Chair to represent a voluntary organisation
21	2023 - 2024	Mollie McGoran	Inverness and Nairn	First Chair from the Scottish Highlands
22	2024 - 2026	Ellie Craig	Glasgow Cathcart	First Chair to lead an entirely female board chair during 25th Anniversary Year Served two terms as Chair
23	Incumbent Chair	Jack Anderson	Dundee City East

== Chief Executive Officers ==
Years of Office	Name	Time Served
2002 - 2003	Alan Gemmell	11 Months
2003 - 2004	Stephen Bermingham	9 Months
2004 - 2006	Derek Millar	1 Year, 11 Months
2006 - 2008	Kelly Chambers	1 Year, 5 Months
2008 - 2010	Ann Brown	2 Years, 5 Months
2010 - 2015	Hamira Khan	4 Years, 7 Months
2015 - 2023	Ben McKendrick	7 years, 10 months
2023–Present	Jamie Dunlop	Current CEO

== Alumni ==
Ross Greer, Green MSP for the West of Scotland and the youngest MSP ever elected to the Scottish Parliament (2016–present), is a former MSYP.

Danielle Rowley, former Labour MP for Midlothian (2017–19), is a former MSYP.

== See also ==
- Aberdeen City Youth Council
- Community youth development
- Youth politics
- Youth rights
- Welsh Youth Parliament
