= National Council for Voluntary Youth Services =

English youth organisation network

- Abbreviation: NCVYS
- Formation: 1936
- Dissolved: 2016
- Type: Registered charity, company limited by guarantee
- Legal status: Closed
- Purpose: Youth organisation development and Youth empowerment
- Headquarters: London
- Region served: England
- Members: approx. 280 member organisations
- Main organ: Board of Trustees
- Website: NCVYS website

The National Council for Voluntary Youth Services (NCVYS) was a membership network of over 200 voluntary and community organisations, as well as local and regional networks, that work with and for young people across England. The organisation closed in 2016. For 80 years, NCVYS acted as an independent voice of the voluntary and community youth sector, working to inform and influence public policy, supporting members to improve the quality of their work, and also raising the profile of the voluntary and community sector's work with young people.

== History ==
NCVYS was founded on 24 March 1936 by representatives of 11 of England's largest youth organisations (known then as 'juvenile organisations'). They met under the auspices of the 'National Council of Social Services', now known as the National Council for Voluntary Organisations (NCVO), of which NCVYS has remained a member. The representatives agreed to form a 'Standing Conference of Juvenile Organisations' (SCJO) to promote mutual cooperation and coordination between their organisations. The first meeting of the new committee was held on 26 May 1936.

The 11 organisations which contributed to the foundation of SCJO/NCVYS were The National Association of Boys' Clubs; Boys' Brigade; YMCA; YWCA; The Girls' Guildry; Church Lads' Brigade (now known as the Church Lads' and Church Girls' Brigade); The Girls' Friendly Society (now known as GFS Platform); Boy Scouts Association; Girl Guides Association; The National Council of Girls' Clubs; and the Girls Life Brigade. All remain as members, though some have changed their name or merged with other organisations.

Captain Stanley Smith of the Boys' Brigade was elected as the first chairman.

From 1939, membership was open to so-called 'National Juvenile Organisations' which had a membership of at least 10,000, which were non-political in nature, and which worked towards assisting youths' mental, moral or physical training for citizenship. These requirements remained until 1972, when it was decided that a membership of 10,000 was no longer necessary. The constitution was also changed at this time so that members were now classified as 'Community and Voluntary Youth Services', which included local government initiatives, or 'National Voluntary Youth Organisations', which included charities and foundations.

The SCJO was renamed several times, but remained consistent in its aims and values. In 1939 it became the 'Standing Conference for National Juvenile Organisations' (SCNJO); then in 1943 it became the 'Standing Conference of National Voluntary Organisations' (SCNVJO). It acquired its current name, NCVYS, in 1972.

By 1947, the total number of young people involved with its member organisations was nearly 2 million.

=== 1970s ===
A new name, The National Council for Voluntary Youth Services (NCVYS) was proposed and adopted on 15 September 1972. A further review of the constitution was also adopted, which defined a new statement of aims: ‘to endeavour to meet the needs and aspirations of young people by strengthening and supporting the work of its members’. In addition to constitutional reforms, membership arrangements were simplified: the requirements for member organisations to have over 10,000 was dropped and two member categories were established, full and observer members. Most crucially, full members were divided into two groups, national voluntary youth organisations and, for the first time, local councils for voluntary youth services. The need for the participation of young people at national and local levels was stressed.

The new NCVYS set about its task in the immediate aftermath of ‘Youth and Community Work in the 1970s’, a comprehensive piece of research into the needs of the youth service in the 1970s. The report produced recommendations for action by statuary and voluntary bodies, training agencies, churches, unions and industry designed to inspire an integrated youth and community service. The authors felt that the existing youth age limits should disappear, that youth work should extend far beyond ‘the club’ to wherever it was needed in the community. Nonetheless, ‘Youth and Community Work in the 1970s’ made little impact on the government. NCVYS, along with many other organisations locally and nationally, was becoming increasingly concerned by the seeming absence of any government policy on the youth service. NCVYS continued putting pressure on the government for more consultation and this led to the formation of the Youth Services Forum in 1976, which was attended by delegates from NCVYS, the National Association of Youth Service Officers, and the Community and Youth Services Association. The local authority associations were also included and there was also representation of people under 25. Out of the Youth Service Forum arose, in 1978, another body, the All Party Parliamentary Lobby on Youth Affairs.

Through 1976, 1977 and 1978, NCVYS was heavily involved in the production of influential reports on issues such as the age of consent; young people and homosexuality and the homeless and young, although the one on homosexuality was never formally endorsed. 1977 saw the Silver Jubilee of Queens Elizabeth and NCVYS members were actively involved in supporting the appeal to establish a Trust to ‘help young people help others’. In addition, NCVYS itself played a key role in the BBV Nationwide Jubilee Youth Appeal. Around the same period, the executive committee received proposals for the formation of the Prince of Wales Trust which it endorsed with enthusiasm. The dissolution of the Youth Service Forum in 1978 caused some resentment among youth services. It was not long, however, before NCVYS, the National Youth Bureau and the two youth and community service associations were meeting as the ‘Youth Service Partners’, an arrangement which would carry on into the 1980s with the later addition of the British Youth Council.

=== 1980s ===
In March 1981, the government initiated a review of the youth service. A small group was appointed to tackle the job over an 18-month period. Francis Cattermole, newly appointed director of NCVYS was a member of the review group, which was tasked with report on the current provisions in the Youth Service; to consider whether available resources could be employed more efficiently; and to assess the needs for legislation. Financial concerns were, yet again, apparent in the 1980s: the government maintained the level of headquarter grants but, in spite of spirited youth service resistance insisted on delegating all responsibility for capital grants to Local Authorities. In addition, the Chancellor would not exempt voluntary organisations from paying VAT. All this caused increasing frustration and resentment.

Youth unemployment was a matter of serious and continuing concerns in the 1980s. NCVYS sought through seminars and the provision of practical proposals, to improve the Youth Opportunities Programme, which had been established in 1978. The summer of 1981 saw the riots in Toxteth, Brixton and elsewhere bringing anger and anguish to those workers who had warned in vain and tried long and hard to counter the alienation such violence expressed. A disillusioned cynicism met the belated attempts of politicians to remedy the inner city despair: ‘Young people are seen as a problem to be treated, rather than a significant part of society to be valued’, noted the director of NCVYS. Much NCVYS work undertaken that year, whilst not specifically done because of the riots, became more urgent because of them. Multi-cultural programmes were encouraged and supported in constituent organisations.

In 1982, the reports of the Youth Service Review Group was published. Entitled ‘Experience and Participation’, the report underlined educational nature of the Youth Service and its role in enabling young people to have a variety of experiences and to learn from the experiences they receive. Most importantly, the report recommended a legislative base for the Youth Service with Ministerial responsibility at national level, a national advisory council, and better partnership at local level. Better support for staff, and more attention to training were highlighted. Parliamentary pressure continued to mount in 1983 and 1984. Finally, in July 1984, Sir Keith Joseph, the Secretary of State for Education, made a statement announcing the issue of a draft circular on the youth service. Though the Ministry felt legislation to be unnecessary, local authorities and, in an unusual departure from normal practice, voluntary youth organisations were invited to commend on the draft circular. NCVYS responded duly, welcoming the more positive aspect of the circular, but regretting the absence of legislation to put the youth service on a firm foundation, and the lack of mandatory training grants. Various constructive suggestions were made, which were accepted almost in full in the circular issues in March 1985.

In May 1986, after a substantial piece of work by the youth social affairs committee and the executive, NCVYS Council overwhelmingly approved a ‘Policy to Promote Equality of Opportunity for girls and young women, people from black and other ethnic minority groups, people with disabilities and lesbian and gay people’.

== Activities ==
NCVYS works with a range of organisations and key partners to deliver a range of projects on a local, regional and national level. All projects aim to benefit member organisations and the young people NCVYS works with. .

=== Youth Report ===
Youth Report is a new intelligence hub focused on young people. The objective of the project is to create the most comprehensive knowledge bank for effective youth support practice and impact, providing data and statistics on young people and youth services in the UK, as well as for information on current youth policy initiatives and youth research.

=== The Young People’s Health Partnership ===
The Young People's Health Partnership (YPHP) is a seven-strong consortium of organisations working with the Department of Health (United Kingdom), Public Health England and NHS England as strategic partners to raise the profile of the health agenda across the voluntary youth sector. The partnership will champion young people's health needs whilst providing a conduit for youth organisations, the state and young people to work towards reducing health inequalities.

=== Action Squad Programme ===
Through its funding from the Youth Social Action Journey Fund, NCVYS has partnered with The Canal & River Trust, The National Federation of Young Farmers' Clubs and The Royal Society for the Protection of Birds to deliver the Action Squad Programme. The partnership is consolidating existing expertise, practice and networks to deliver social action squads, providing 1,500 new environmental and rural youth social action opportunities for young people who may want to get involved in the National Citizen Service (NCS) and those graduating from NCS. The programme has set up the Action Squad Academy, through which organisations can promote social action opportunities to young people and also find resources and tools for good practice.

=== The Children’s Partnership ===
The Children's Partnership is a collaboration between 4Children and the National Children's Bureau. Over the years 2013–2015, the Partnership works with a consortium of organisations including Barnardo's, Family and Childcare Trust, NCVYS, NAVCA, NCVO and NSPCC. Bringing together leading practice into online resources, knowledge exchange and cross-sector working, the Partnership will provide policy and delivery advice to government and support the sector to develop new and sustainable approaches.

== Membership ==
NCVYS had over 280 member organisations, which all work for the personal and social development of young people. Their precise nature varied from regional or local networks, to national organisations, and they focus on a variety of areas. These include engaging young people in decision-making processes; providing safe environments where young people can develop as individuals; promoting opportunities and services to a diverse range of young people; and developing and delivering government policies and practice that responds to the needs of young people.

The NCVYS network allowed members to share and develop best practice in the sector, as well as receive practical advice and information on policy updates. It also allows NCVYS to act as the voice of the voluntary and community youth sector, giving members the opportunity to influence government policy and giving them a platform to raise the profile of the work that they do.

=== All-Party Parliamentary Group on Youth Affairs ===
The APPG on Youth Affairs was established in 1998 to raise the profile of issues that affect and concern young people; encourage dialogue between parliamentarians, young people and youth services; and encourage a co-ordinated and coherent approach to youth policy making. The group currently has over 100 members, drawn from both Houses of Parliament.

NCVYS, YMCA England and the British Youth Council run the Secretariat for the APPG. Stewart Jackson MP (Con), Julie Hilling MP (Lab) and Simon Hughes MP (LD) chair the APPG. It is also supported by an advisory group of experts drawn from organisations that work with young people.

=== Policy Information and Consultations ===
One of NCVYS's key aims was to inform and influence policy that impacts on young people and the voluntary sector at a local, regional and national level. It does this by providing policy information and analysis for its members on issues that affect young people and the organisations that work with them. NCVYS also works with its members to formulate policy positions on behalf of the voluntary and community youth sector, either proactively or in response to government consultations. To assist this work it is involved with a number of coalitions and initiatives, including End Child Poverty, Shine Week and Change4Life. Current policy work areas include safeguarding and child protection; education, employment and training; youth justice; volunteering and positive activities; and local strategic arrangements.

=== Events and Conferences ===
NCVYS has been involved in many external sector events as well as hosting its own events, conferences, seminars and AGM. In July 2009, ENVOY members participated in Shine Week, an annual celebration of young people's talent and achievement set up by the Department for Children, Schools and Families in 2008. Activities in 2009 included a series of debates on the state of youth in the UK today, held in the House of Lords.

=== Publications ===
NCVYS published a series of newsletters, magazines and information packs including the following:

- Exchange – a quarterly national magazine which highlights issues, news, policy analysis and events of interest to the voluntary and community youth sector. It also compiles articles and case studies that give practical advice for those individuals and organisations which work in the voluntary and community youth sector. Its readership is around 3,000 individuals nationally.The front cover of each issue of Exchange is created by a young designer, who interprets the theme of the magazine through their artwork. In the past, young designers have included Saliqur Rohman, from East London, who created the front cover of the Spring 2009 issue to depict the theme of 'young people and faith'. The Summer 2009 issue on disability was designed by Gareth Daley, a young freelance designer originally from Manchester, who used the 'disable the label' tagline and imagery. Employing young designers enables NCVYS to involve young people in its work, thereby helping to put the organisation's vision and values into practice, as well as giving them the exposure and promotion which they need to succeed.
- Careers Guide – aimed at young people, this pamphlet provides a brief introduction to careers in the voluntary and community youth sector.
- Factor in Faith – a guide to help youth organisations consider their approach towards young people's faith and culture.
- Keeping It Safe toolkit – a guide to safeguarding standards for voluntary youth organisations. It gives practical advice on organisational policies and procedures, safe recruitment and selection, reporting concerns, suspicions and allegations, managing paid and volunteer staff, how to provide education, training and support and how to provide safe activities. Keeping It Safe is part of the wider national Sound Systems accreditation scheme which encourages, promotes and recognises good practice in safeguarding and child protection.

== Members ==
Members of NCVYS include:

- Army Cadet Force Association
- Asthma UK
- Baptist Union of Great Britain
- The Boys' Brigade
- British Red Cross
- British Youth Council
- Children's Rights Alliance for England
- Church Army
- Church Lads' and Girl's Brigade
- Churches Together in England
- The Duke of Edinburgh's Award
- Fairbridge
- Girlguiding UK
- The Girls' Brigade
- Girls Venture Corps Air Cadets
- Hope UK
- Jewish Lads' and Girls' Brigade
- Kids
- The Leaveners
- Maccabi GB
- Marine Society and Sea Cadets
- Mencap Leisure Services
- Movement for Reform Judaism
- National Council for Drama Training
- The National Trust
- National Youth Theatre of Great Britain
- Oasis Trust
- The Princess Royal Trust for Carers
- The Prince's Trust
- Raleigh International
- Rathbone
- The Royal British Legion
- The Royal Wildlife Trusts
- RSPB
- RSPCA
- The Salvation Army
- The Scout Association
- St John Ambulance
- Student Action For Refugees (STAR)
- Tall Ships Youth Trust
- UK Youth Parliament
- UNICEF UK
- The Woodcraft Folk
- YMCA England
- Young Christian Workers
- Young Lives
- Youth Hostels Association
- Youth for Christ
- YWCA England and Wales

== Closure ==
On 1 April 2016, the organisation closed, transferring some of its services to other charities and organisations. It also deposited its archive at UCL Institute of Education. During 2017 following two meetings of Local Councils for Voluntary Youth Services, one in Wolverhampton in January held at Youth Organisations Wolverhampton and one in November held at The Royal Society of Arts recognising the need in England a Network for Councils for Voluntary Youth Services England was established which will meet in the North and the South of England. The website for this will follow adaptation of an available CVYS site.

== See also ==
- Youth services
- Scottish Council for Voluntary Organisations (SCVO), an umbrella body for voluntary organisations in Scotland
