= Children's Rights Alliance for England =

English children's rights advocacy group

- Abbreviation: CRAE
- Founded: 1991
- Type: Pressure group
- Purpose: Youth empowerment
- Headquarters: London, N1
- Region served: England
- Members: 380+ organisations
- Director: Louise King
- Main organ: Just for Kids Law
- Website: CRAE.org.uk

Children's Rights Alliance For England (CRAE) is a London-based advocacy group that aims to protect children's rights in the UK. Since 2015, it has operated as part of the children's charity Just for Kids Law.

CRAE was founded in 1991 to monitor the UK government's commitment to upholding the United Nations Convention on the Rights of the Child. Their methods include lobbying government and others who hold power, supporting test cases, and using regional and international human rights mechanisms. CRAE also publishes an annual review of the state of children's rights in England.

They also provide free legal information and advice to young people, raise awareness of children's human rights, and undertake research about children's access to their rights. As such, they are a member of the National Council for Voluntary Youth Services, an English organisation that supports and promotes the work of youth groups and charities.

== Get Ready for Geneva and Get Ready for Change ==
From April 2007 CRAE wrote a report on and tried influence the UK's response to the Convention on the Rights of the Child through their youth-led campaign arm Get Ready for Geneva.

Following the publication of the concluding observations of the United Nations Committee on the Rights of the Child in October 2008, the "Get Ready for Geneva" project became "Get Ready for Change". The group now lobbies the UK government with the aim of securing resolutions to the issues that the committee raised.

== See it, Say It, Change it ==
In February 2015, CRAE assembled a new steering group of 21 children and young people to create another report to the United Nations on the state of children's rights in England. This report was published in July 2015, and was launched in the Houses of Parliament, with MPs such as Tulip Siddiq and Alison Thewliss in attendance.

The group attended the United Nations session in October 2015 to provide more evidence on topics mentioned in the report. The concluding observations contained material that CRAE had themselves suggested.

The campaign stage of the project is now underway, and the main focus of the campaign is lobbying the government to either stick to their 6-week legal limit on housing people in bed and breakfasts, or abolish this altogether.

== See also ==
- gandu rights
