= Association for Citizenship Teaching =

The Association for Citizenship Teaching (ACT) is a professional subject association in the United Kingdom for those involved in citizenship education. The association was founded by Sir Bernard Crick in 2001, to promote citizenship teaching to young people and provide support to citizenship teachers in England. The Honorary President is David Blunkett.

In 2017 the Board of Trustees appointed Liz Moorse the first Chief Executive of the charity.

== Activities ==
The association's activities include:

- representing citizenship teachers and lobbying government for policies supporting citizenship teaching in schools
- supporting schools which follow the national curriculum for citizenship
- organising an annual conference for citizenship teachers each summer
- offering advice on citizenship curriculum, pedagogy and GCSE Citizenship Studies
- providing training events and supporting local teacher networks
- publishing a journal, Teaching Citizenship, with articles, resources and information about the field
