= Family Holiday Charity =

The Family Holiday Charity is a United Kingdom charity. Its stated purpose is the provision of holidays for disadvantaged families .

The charity is chaired by Helen Webb.

== History ==
The Family Holiday Association became a registered national charity in 1975. The charity was started by North London couple Joan and Patrick Laurance with the aim of providing holidays to struggling families. The charity legally changed its name to Family Holiday Charity in 2022.
