= National Youth Agency =

The National Youth Agency (NYA) is an educational charity in England and Wales that works in partnership with a wide range of public, private and voluntary sector organizations to support and improve services for young people.

The NYA's particular focus is on youth work and it believes that by investing in young people’s personal and social development young people are better able to live more active and fulfilling lives.

It has four themes:

Developing quality standards in work with young people.
Supporting services for young people.
Developing the youth workforce.
Promoting positive public perceptions of young people.

Work is delivered through training and consultancy, campaigning, publishing and online communications. The NYA also validates youth worker training courses. Through its activities the NYA wants to ensure that young people have a strong voice and positive influence in society. Funding is received from a number of sources including national and local government and private organisations.

The NYA is based in Leicester in the United Kingdom and employs some fifty people directly, but also has a large and expanding associate network. Its chief executive since July 2017 is Leigh Middleton.

On 16 April 2018 NYA underwent a huge re-brand after internal changes. The new brand was designed to bring NYA a more user-friendly look and reflect a new dynamism.

The National Youth Agency is the parent company of the UK Youth Parliament since May 2024.
