= Tunde Sobulo =

Nigerian police officer

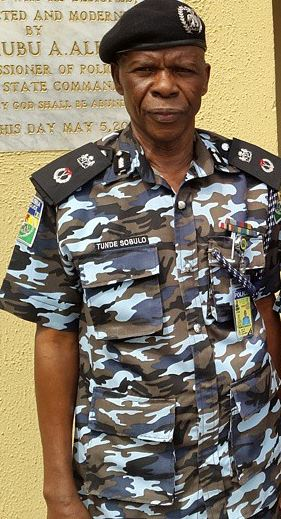
Commissioner of Police Tunde Sobulo (MON) at Police Command Ikeja (2014)

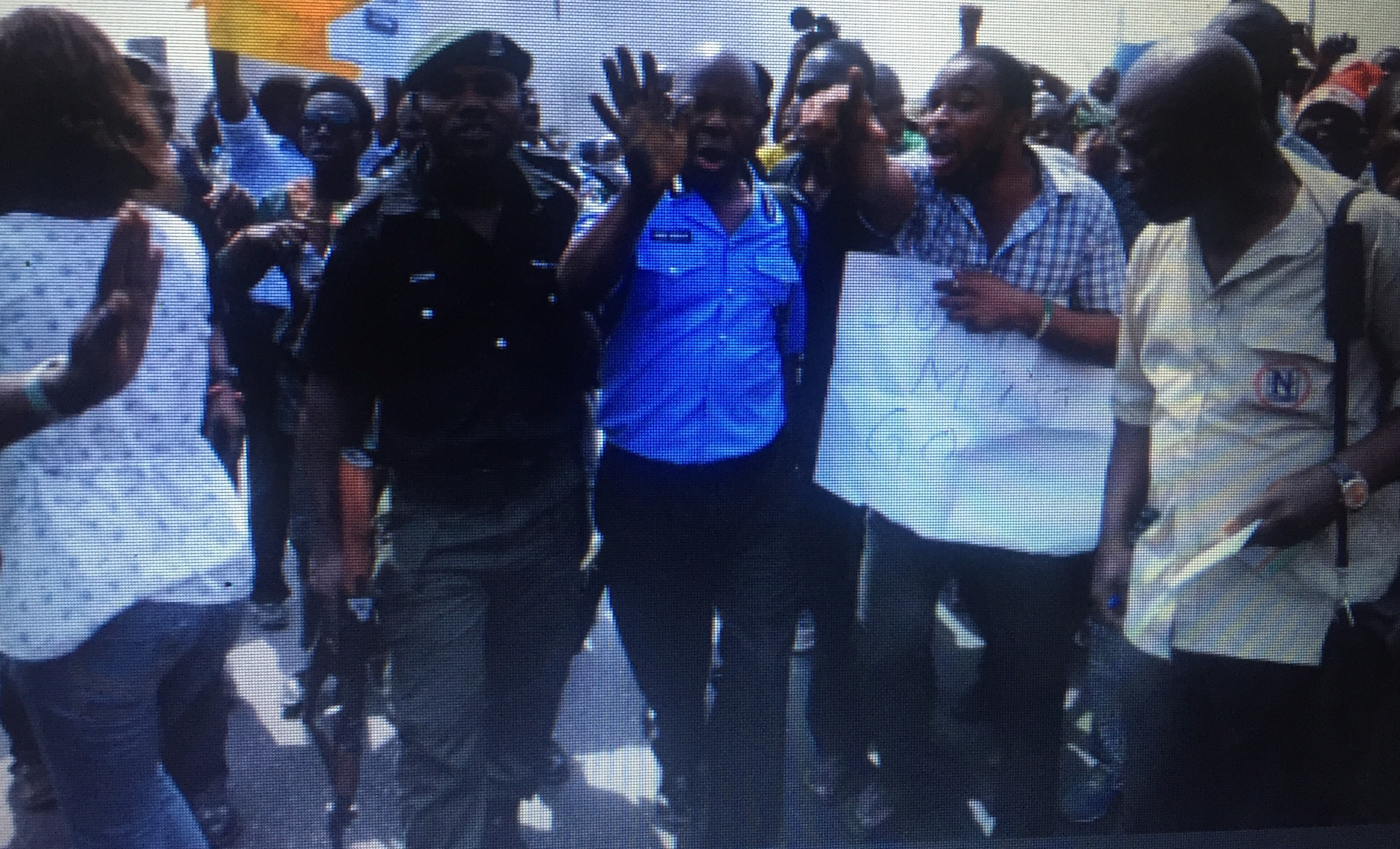
Deputy Commissioner of Police (Operations) Fuel Subsidy Crisis 2012, Occupy Nigeria 2012

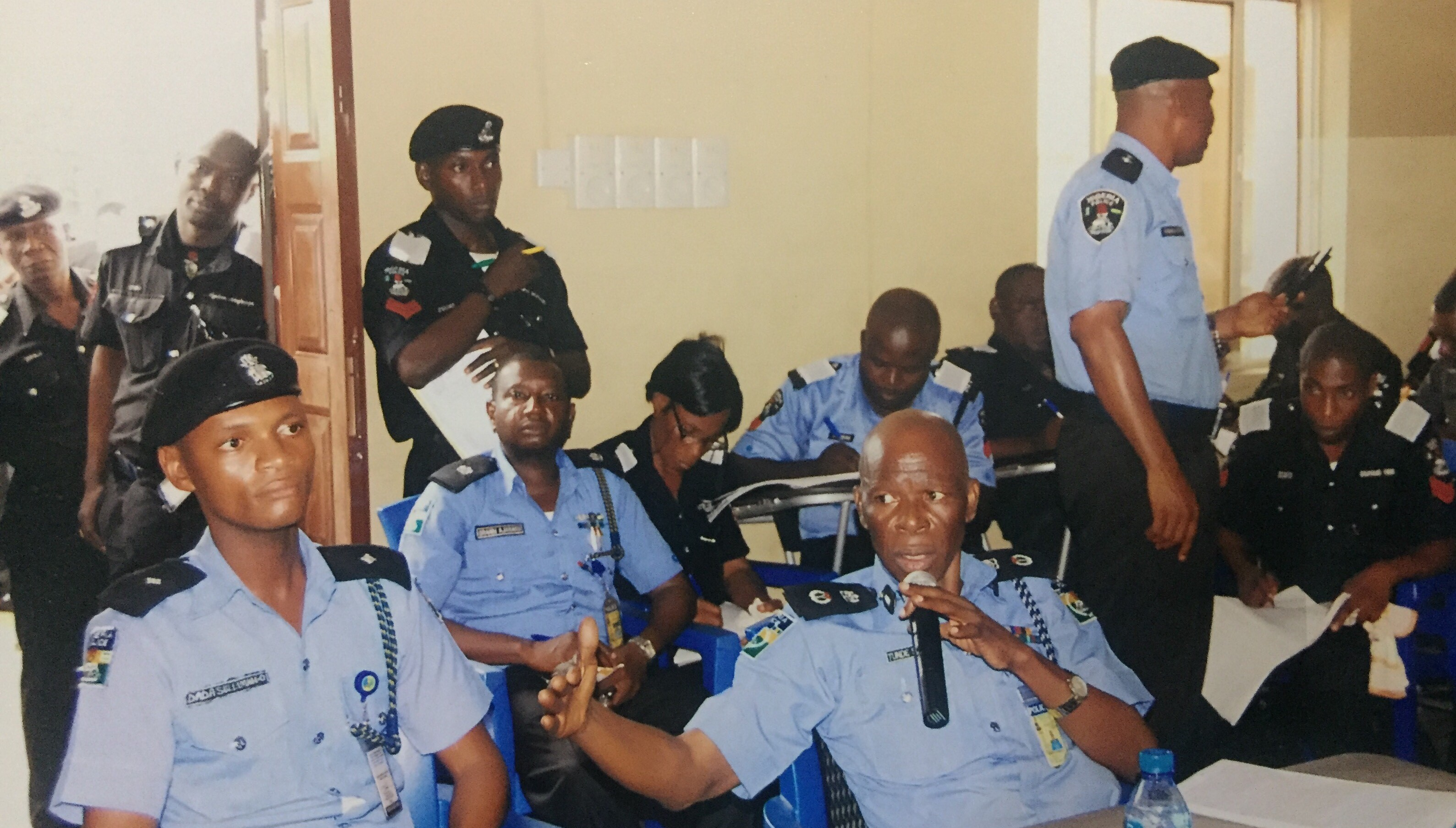
Commandant Lecturing Course Participants On General Principle of Law

CP Benedict Tunde Sobulo (MON), (Aka Super Cop, AKA Operations), (December 31, 1957 – October 2, 2015) was a Nigerian Policeman born in Abeokuta, Ogun State in Nigeria. He enlisted in the Nigerian Army immediately after secondary school and rose to the rank of warrant officer before leaving for the United States where he met and married an American, Zera Blonese Lancaster, who bore him his first son Robert Sobulo.

== Education ==
Sobulo attended Roger Williams University, Bristol, Rhode Island, and Bryant College, Smithfield, Rhode Island, where he obtained his BSc in criminal justice s well as an MBA and a Masters in Public Administration. He worked at different correctional institutions in the United States before he moved back to Nigeria.

== Career ==
Sobulo began his career in the Nigeria police force by undertaking his NYSC at Force C.I.D. Training School. He entered the Nigeria police force as a cadet in 1984 and completed his training at the prestigious Police Staff College in Jos. He served in different police formations across the nation and began making his mark fighting the insurgency as the second in command of the Mopol 9 Squadron in Kano. He served as the commander of Operation Sweep that took on the cross-border armed robbery gang leader Shina Rambo who terrorized Lagos residents in the early 1990s.

He was part of the committee that instituted the statewide ban of commercial motorbikes (okada) on Lagos highways. This led to a drastic decrease in late night robberies across the state. He was also one of the founders and the first Commander of the Rapid Response Squad (RRS), a unit that was modeled to respond to crime with tactics like American SWAT teams. He concurrently served as the Commander of Mopol 20, another special wing of the Nigeria Police Force that was instituted to counter riots and extreme situations. He served as Assistant Commissioner of Police in charge of Operations in both Lagos and Rivers states. He also held the position of Second in Command in the Joint Military Task Force while holding the position of Assistant Commissioner of Police (Operations) in Rivers State. He was Area Commander in Orlu Imo State, as well as Area Commander to Ondo State before being promoted to Deputy Commissioner of Police in charge of Operations in Lagos State. The Crime Fighter upon his redeployment to Lagos, was quickly assigned the task of quelling protests that resulted from the 2012 Petrol Subsidy Crisis. He was Deputy Commissioner (Operations) until he was promoted to the rank of Commissioner of Police and served as Commandant Police College Ikeja. He died on October 2, 2015, and was buried in Mount Harmony Memorial Gardens, Mableton, Georgia, United States.
