= 2011 Sandwell Metropolitan Borough Council election =

2011 English borough election

← 2010	5 May 2011	2012 →

One third (24) seats to Sandwell Borough Council
	First party	Second party	Third party
Party	Labour	Conservative	Liberal Democrats
Seats won	58	9	3
Seat change	▲1	Steady	▼1
Popular vote	50,950	20,056	3,768
Percentage	65.6%	25.8%	4.8%
- 2011 local election results in Sandwell
Council control before election
Labour
Council control after election
Labour

The 2011 Sandwell Metropolitan Borough Council election took place on 5 May 2011 to elect members of Sandwell Metropolitan Borough Council in the West Midlands, England. One third of the council was up for election and the Labour Party stayed in overall control of the council.

After the election, the composition of the council was:

- Labour 58
- Conservative 9
- Liberal Democrat 3
- Independent 1
- Independent Socialist 1

== Background ==
Labour defended 22 of the 24 seats which were contested in 2011, compared to 1 seat being defended each for the Conservatives and Liberal Democrats. Labour councillors defending seats included Elaine Costigan, who had defected from the Conservatives, and the deputy leader of the council Steve Eling.

The British National Party only contested 2 seats, compared to 17 when these seats were last contested in 2007 and a full slate in 2010. A new Traditional Conservative Party, led by the former Sandwell Conservative leader Tony Ward, also put up candidates. Ward had left the Conservatives after being deposed as leader in 2010.

== Election result ==
The results saw Labour maintain a majority on the council after making a gain of one seat from the Liberal Democrats. This meant Labour took 23 of the 24 seats contested and therefore had 58 of the 72 councillors. The only seat not won by Labour was held by the Conservatives in Charlemont with Grove Vale.

Sandwell local election result 2011
Party	Seats	Gains	Losses	Net gain/loss	Seats %	Votes %	Votes	+/−
Labour	23	▲1	Steady	▲1	95.8	65.6	50,950	▲18.2
Conservative	1	Steady	Steady	Steady	4.2	25.8	20,056	▼2.1
Liberal Democrats	0	Steady	▼1	▼1	0	4.8	3,768	▼5.7
Green	0	Steady	Steady	Steady	0	1.9	1,481	▲0.8
BNP	0	Steady	Steady	Steady	0	0.8	616	▼10.7
Sandwell Traditional Conservatives	0	Steady	Steady	Steady	0	0.5	413	▲0.5
National Front	0	Steady	Steady	Steady	0	0.5	410	▲0.5

== Ward results ==
Abbey
Party	Candidate	Votes	%	±%
Labour	Steven Eling	2,651	68.5	▲10.9
Conservative	Hughie Johnson	696	18.0	▼6.3
Green	Barry Lim	357	9.2	▼2.0
Liberal Democrats	Bryan Manley-Green	166	4.3	▲4.3
Majority		1,955	50.5	▲17.3
Turnout		3,870		
Labour hold		Swing		

Blackheath
Party	Candidate	Votes	%	±%
Labour	Robert Price	1,880	58.6	▼17.3
Conservative	Debbie Elwell	1,326	41.4	▲6.1
Majority		554	17.3	▲11.3
Turnout		3,206		
Labour hold		Swing		

Bristnall
Party	Candidate	Votes	%	±%
Labour	Lucy Cashmore	2,003	66.5	▲20.4
Conservative	Chris Brown	1,011	33.5	▲4.7
Majority		992	32.9	▲15.6
Turnout		3,014		
Labour hold		Swing		

Charlemont with Grove Vale
Party	Candidate	Votes	%	±%
Conservative	Anne Hughes	1,624	44.8	▲4.0
Labour	Liam Preece	1,512	41.7	▲10.0
Green	Dell Macefield	251	6.9	▲4.6
Liberal Democrats	David Fisher	242	6.7	▼8.9
Majority		112	3.1	▼6.1
Turnout		3,629		
Conservative hold		Swing		

Cradley Heath and Old Hill
Party	Candidate	Votes	%	±%
Labour	Ann Shackleton	2,223	62.2	▲17.9
Conservative	Alan Bowler	1,150	32.2	▼0.2
Liberal Democrats	Robert Johns	200	5.6	▼8.1
Majority		1,073	30.0	▲18.1
Turnout		3,573		
Labour hold		Swing		

Friar Park
Party	Candidate	Votes	%	±%
Labour	Joy Edis	1,555	64.8	▲18.5
Conservative	Paul Farrington	671	28.0	▲0.7
Liberal Democrats	Mary Wilson	172	7.2	▼4.2
Majority		884	36.9	▲17.9
Turnout		2,398		
Labour hold		Swing		

Great Barr with Yew Tree
Party	Candidate	Votes	%	±%
Labour	Shirley Hosell	1,831	48.1	▲10.8
Liberal Democrats	Keith Allcock	950	24.9	▼4.9
Conservative	Robert White	629	16.5	▼6.2
BNP	Terry Lewin	275	7.2	▼3.0
Sandwell Traditional Conservatives	Margaret Macklin	125	3.3	▲3.3
Majority		881	23.1	▲15.6
Turnout		3,810		
Labour gain from Liberal Democrats		Swing		

Great Bridge
Party	Candidate	Votes	%	±%
Labour	Pete Allen	1,928	73.8	▲33.5
Conservative	Steve Simcox	686	26.2	▲4.2
Majority		1,242	47.5	▲29.2
Turnout		2,614		
Labour hold		Swing		

Greets Green and Lyng
Party	Candidate	Votes	%	±%
Labour	Gurcharan Sidhu	1,982	73.1	▲16.5
Conservative	Christine Vickers	532	19.6	▼1.1
Liberal Democrats	Richard Mitchener	197	7.3	▼2.9
Majority		1,450	53.5	▲17.5
Turnout		2,711		
Labour hold		Swing		

Hateley Heath
Party	Candidate	Votes	%	±%
Labour	Pat Davies	1,911	66.7	▲14.6
Conservative	Mark Cowles	833	29.1	▲0.6
Liberal Democrats	Dorothy Brayshaw	121	4.2	▲4.2
Majority		1,078	37.6	▲14.1
Turnout		2,865		
Labour hold		Swing		

Langley
Party	Candidate	Votes	%	±%
Labour	Yvonne Davies	2,032	67.8	▲22.0
Conservative	Maria Jones	966	32.2	▲2.6
Majority		1,066	35.6	▲19.4
Turnout		2,998		
Labour hold		Swing		

Newton
Party	Candidate	Votes	%	±%
Labour	David Hosell	1,787	49.6	▲15.4
Liberal Democrats	Kay Allcock	1,048	29.1	▼6.9
Conservative	Robert Fotzpatrick	680	18.9	▼3.6
Sandwell Traditional Conservatives	Emma Monasch	89	2.5	▲2.5
Majority		739	20.5	
Turnout		3,604		
Labour hold		Swing		

Old Warley
Party	Candidate	Votes	%	±%
Labour	Trevor Crumpton	2,027	54.9	▲14.7
Conservative	Maurice Gaunt	1,102	29.9	▼3.9
Sandwell Traditional Conservatives	John McHard	199	5.4	▲5.4
Green	Aldo Mussi	183	5.0	▲2.0
Liberal Democrats	Bob Smith	179	4.9	▼9.8
Majority		925	25.1	▲18.6
Turnout		3,690		
Labour hold		Swing		

Oldbury
Party	Candidate	Votes	%	±%
Labour	Elaine Giles	2,729	81.5	▲15.6
Conservative	Edward Barnfield	619	18.5	▼3.1
Majority		2,110	63.0	▲18.6
Turnout		3,348		
Labour hold		Swing		

Princes End
Party	Candidate	Votes	%	±%
Labour	Stephen Jones	1,348	55.3	▲13.2
Conservative	Steve Downing	750	30.8	▼0.6
BNP	Russ Green	341	14.0	▼12.5
Majority		598	24.5	▲13.8
Turnout		2,439		
Labour hold		Swing		

Rowley
Party	Candidate	Votes	%	±%
Labour	Barbara Price	1,821	62.3	▲13.1
Conservative	Thomas Millward	1,101	37.7	▲2.1
Majority		720	24.6	▲11.0
Turnout		2,922		
Labour hold		Swing		

Smethwick
Party	Candidate	Votes	%	±%
Labour	Keith Davies	2,419	70.7	▲7.7
Conservative	Gurpeet Cheema	664	19.4	▼5.5
Green	Neil Barlow	339	9.9	▲9.9
Majority		1,755	51.3	▲13.3
Turnout		3,422		
Labour hold		Swing		

Soho and Victoria
Party	Candidate	Votes	%	±%
Labour	Roger Horton	3,201	90.8	▲23.5
Conservative	Altaf Ahmed	324	9.2	▼3.3
Majority		2,877	81.6	▲30.6
Turnout		3,525		
Labour hold		Swing		

St Paul's
Party	Candidate	Votes	%	±%
Labour	Zahoor Ahmed	3,123	81.9	▲29.8
Conservative	Nagi Singh	691	18.1	▼3.8
Majority		2,432	63.8	▲33.5
Turnout		3,814		
Labour hold		Swing		

Tipton Green
Party	Candidate	Votes	%	±%
Labour	Syeda Khatun	2,181	64.4	▲23.1
Conservative	Nathan Poole	798	23.5	▼6.0
National Front	Ade Woodhouse	410	12.1	▲12.1
Majority		1,383	40.8	▲29.0
Turnout		3,389		
Labour hold		Swing		

Tividale
Party	Candidate	Votes	%	±%
Labour	Lorraine Ashman	1,884	64.7	▲23.8
Conservative	Ben Elwell	840	28.8	▼0.9
Liberal Democrats	Joanne Arnold	189	6.5	▼8.5
Majority		1,044	35.8	▲24.6
Turnout		2,913		
Labour hold		Swing		

Wednesbury North
Party	Candidate	Votes	%	±%
Labour	Elaine Costigan	2,029	67.5	▲29.3
Conservative	Marc Lucock	885	29.4	▼9.8
Liberal Democrats	Gareth Loveridge	93	3.1	▼7.4
Majority		1,144	38.1	
Turnout		3,007		
Labour hold		Swing		

Wednesbury South
Party	Candidate	Votes	%	±%
Labour	Olwen Jones	2,372	72.2	▲21.1
Conservative	Bash Hussain	912	27.8	▼6.3
Majority		1,460	44.5	▲27.5
Turnout		3,284		
Labour hold		Swing		

West Bromwich Central
Party	Candidate	Votes	%	±%
Labour	Bawa Dhallu	2,521	69.1	▲11.0
Conservative	Jack Sabharwal	566	15.5	▼2.5
Green	David Hawkins	351	9.6	▲6.4
Liberal Democrats	Thomas Underhill	211	5.8	▼8.0
Majority		1,955	53.6	▲13.5
Turnout		3,649		
Labour hold		Swing		
