= Georgia's 39th House of Representatives district =

State district in Georgia, USA

Georgia's 39th State House of Representatives district
Representative
Terry Cummings; D–Mableton
- Demographics: 23.5% White; 57.1% Black; 16.0% Hispanic; 1.7% Asian
- Population: 58,304

District 39 elects one member of the Georgia House of Representatives. It contains parts of Cobb County including the cities of Austell and Mableton.

== Members ==
- Alisha Thomas Morgan (2003–2015)
- Erica Thomas (2015–2023)
- Terry Cummings (since 2023)
