= Yael Foundation =

- Formation: 2020
- Type: Philanthropic foundation
- Purpose: Jewish education
- Region served: Worldwide
- Website: www.yaelfoundation.org

Yael Foundation is a philanthropic organization that invests in Jewish education worldwide. It was founded in 2020 by Uri and Yael Poliavich. The organization provides funding and strategic support to Jewish schools and educational initiatives in multiple countries. Its mission is to support Jewish education and strengthen Jewish identity through long-term investment in educational institutions and programs.

== History ==
The Yael Foundation was established in 2020 as a private philanthropic initiative focused on Jewish education.

== Activities ==
As of 2026, the foundation operates internationally, supporting educational programs across multiple regions.

The foundation provides grants and operational support to Jewish educational institutions, including day schools, kindergartens, and informal education programs. Its activities also include teacher training, institutional development, and initiatives aimed at increasing school enrollment.

In addition to financial support, the organization works with partner institutions to improve educational quality and long-term sustainability. The Yael Foundation supports 100 educational projects across 45 countries, with roughly 22,500 children in 132 educational institutions, of which 120 are schools.

== Programs ==
Yael Foundation operates Yael Schools, a network of International Baccalaureate (IB) World Schools in emerging Jewish communities. The schools combine secular IB curriculum with Jewish subjects, including Torah studies, arts programs, and entrepreneurship education. These new educational institutions - expected to accommodate a large number of students - serve the educational needs of families in these communities and are also intended to serve as models for Jewish education.

The foundation operates a number of programs supporting formal and informal education.

It also organizes an annual international conference for educators and community leaders, known as the Yael Foundation Summit. The event brings together participants from multiple countries to discuss educational practices and challenges.

Yael Foundation operates a summer camp program consisting of two 11-day sessions for Jewish youth from across Europe. It is an immersive program built around strengthening Jewish identity, leadership, and connection.

== Partnerships ==
The foundation has collaborated with other Jewish organizations and institutions on educational initiatives. Following the 2023 Hamas-led attack on Israel, it participated in efforts to support security and infrastructure in Jewish schools.

== Awards ==
Yael Foundation organizes an annual Yael Awards. This is a 2.5-day event featuring lectures and workshops focused on learning, sharing, and strategy development. The event concludes with an awards ceremony that highlights the achievements of schools around the world.

In 2026, the Yael Awards brought together finalists from more than a dozen countries across Europe, Central Asia, Latin America, the Middle East and North America, with honorees selected by an international judging panel that included former Jewish Agency chairman Natan Sharansky.
