= 2003 Sandwell Metropolitan Borough Council election =

2003 UK local government election

The 2003 Sandwell Metropolitan Borough Council election took place on 1 May 2003 to elect members of Sandwell Metropolitan Borough Council in the West Midlands, England. One third of the council was up for election and the Labour Party stayed in overall control of the council.

After the election, the composition of the council was:

- Labour 55
- Conservative 9
- Liberal Democrat 6
- British National Party 2

== Campaign ==
Before the election the Labour party held control of the council with 57 seats, while the Conservatives had 8 seats and the Liberal Democrats 6 seats. A further seat was vacant in Great Bridge ward after the death of Labour councillor Jean Marson. 24 seats were being contested in the election by a total of 83 candidates. Labour was defending 20 of the 24 seats, with the mayor and 5 members of the cabinet among those contesting the election. The Conservatives contested every seat, the Socialist Labour Party stood in 15 seats, Liberal Democrats 10, British National Party 5 and there were 2 candidates from the Freedom Party.

The candidates from the British National Party and the Freedom Party caused controversy, with the UNISON trade union calling on its members to vote against them and boycott any councillors from those parties. A local Labour member of parliament Tom Watson meanwhile said that property prices would fall if any candidates from the British National Party were elected.

== Election result ==
The results saw the British National Party win 2 seats on the council for the first time. The British National Party's John Salvage gained Princes End by 37 votes and David Watkins took Great Bridge by nearly 100 votes. Meanwhile, Labour held control of the council despite dropping seats. The Conservatives gained 1 seat, while the Liberal Democrats stayed on 6 seats.

The first council meeting following the election on 20 May saw a protest by union members against the presence of a British National Party councillor.

Sandwell local election result 2003
Party	Seats	Gains	Losses	Net gain/loss	Seats %	Votes %	Votes	+/−
Labour	17	1	4	-3	70.8	47.0	27,739	-4.6%
Conservative	3	2	1	+1	12.5	28.6	16,897	+1.1%
Liberal Democrats	2	1	1	0	8.3	10.6	6,261	-0.6%
BNP	2	2	0	+2	8.3	5.9	3,483	+4.5%
Socialist Labour	0	0	0	0	0	4.2	2,487	+1.1%
Freedom Party	0	0	0	0	0	2.1	1,219	+0.4%
2003 Community Party	0	0	0	0	0	1.2	732	+1.2%
Green	0	0	0	0	0	0.3	150	+0.3%
UKIP	0	0	0	0	0	0.1	69	+0.1%

== Ward results ==
Abbey
Party	Candidate	Votes	%	±%
Labour	Robert Piper	1,544	56.1	+1.8
Conservative	Ewart Johnson	638	23.2	−3.2
Liberal Democrats	Roger Prior	490	17.8	+3.3
Socialist Labour	Jasvinder Singh	81	2.9	−1.9
Majority		906	32.9	+5.0
Turnout		2,753	31.7	
Labour hold		Swing		

Blackheath
Party	Candidate	Votes	%	±%
Labour	Robert Price	1,200	51.9	−2.2
Conservative	Mary Docker	1,056	45.7	+9.5
Socialist Labour	Rajinder Singh	54	2.3	+2.3
Majority		144	6.2	−11.8
Turnout		2,310	25.7	
Labour hold		Swing		

Bristnall
Party	Candidate	Votes	%	±%
Labour	Richard Young	1,292	56.0	+2.0
Conservative	John McHard	896	38.8	−0.8
Socialist Labour	Sukhjinder Clair	119	5.2	−1.2
Majority		396	17.2	+2.8
Turnout		2,307	24.9	
Labour hold		Swing		

Charlemont
Party	Candidate	Votes	%	±%
Conservative	Anthony Ward	1,153	40.3	+1.6
Liberal Democrats	Anthony Underhill	922	32.2	−3.3
Labour	Victoria Handy	740	25.9	+0.2
Socialist Labour	Nirmala Devi	47	1.6	+1.6
Majority		231	8.1	+4.9
Turnout		2,862	32.1	
Conservative gain from Labour		Swing		

Cradley Heath and Old Hill
Party	Candidate	Votes	%	±%
Labour	John Southall	1,316	61.2	−0.9
Conservative	Susan Bennett	835	38.8	+0.9
Majority		481	22.4	−1.7
Turnout		2,151	23.1	
Labour hold		Swing		

Friar Park
Party	Candidate	Votes	%	±%
Labour	Geoffrey Lewis	935	59.9	−2.8
Conservative	Gaynor Skeldon	444	28.4	+0.8
Liberal Democrats	Yvonne Reed	183	11.7	+2.0
Majority		491	31.4	−3.6
Turnout		1,562	19.2	
Labour hold		Swing		

Great Barr
Party	Candidate	Votes	%	±%
Liberal Democrats	Mary Wilson	1,188	40.9	−3.5
Conservative	Robert White	942	32.4	+5.4
Labour	Sharron Devonport	774	26.7	−1.8
Majority		246	8.5	−7.4
Turnout		2,904	29.4	
Liberal Democrats gain from Conservative		Swing		

Great Bridge
Party	Candidate	Votes	%	±%
BNP	David Watkins	772	31.5	+31.5
2003 Community Party	Fred Perry	732	29.9	−5.1
Labour	Bob Patel	674	27.5	−19.9
Conservative	Diane Meacham	273	11.1	−6.4
Majority		40	1.6	
Turnout		2,451	25.9	
BNP gain from Labour		Swing		

Greets Green and Lyng
Party	Candidate	Votes	%	±%
Labour	Robert Badham	1,024	54.5	−4.0
Conservative	Rosemarie Campbell	537	28.6	+5.0
Liberal Democrats	Philip Roberts	317	16.9	−1.0
Majority		487	25.9	−9.0
Turnout		1,878	24.9	
Labour hold		Swing		

Hateley Heath
Party	Candidate	Votes	%	±%
Labour	John Blyth	930	44.0	−4.2
Liberal Democrats	Rachel Cheeseman	865	41.0	+2.1
Conservative	Mark Elliott	270	12.8	−0.1
Socialist Labour	Chuhar Singh	47	2.2	+2.2
Majority		65	3.1	−6.2
Turnout		2,112	23.1	
Labour gain from Liberal Democrats		Swing		

Langley
Party	Candidate	Votes	%	±%
Labour	Martin Prestidge	1,395	48.4	−6.9
Conservative	Roland Hill	750	26.0	−5.6
BNP	Alan Hipkiss	643	22.3	+22.3
Socialist Labour	Bahadur Shankar	93	3.2	−0.1
Majority		645	22.4	−1.3
Turnout		2,881	30.3	
Labour hold		Swing		

Newton
Party	Candidate	Votes	%	±%
Liberal Democrats	Joyce Underhill	1,341	44.6	−0.6
Labour	Simon Hackett	1,232	40.9	+3.0
Conservative	Valerie Ward	386	12.8	−2.4
Socialist Labour	Baldeesh Singh	50	1.7	+0.0
Majority		109	3.6	−3.6
Turnout		3,009	33.6	
Liberal Democrats hold		Swing		

Oldbury
Party	Candidate	Votes	%	±%
Labour	Mahboob Hussain	1,619	55.1	+3.2
Conservative	David Hadley	756	25.7	+3.9
Liberal Democrats	Christopher Reed	291	9.9	−2.7
Socialist Labour	Atma Matharu	270	9.2	−4.6
Majority		863	29.4	−0.6
Turnout		2,936	35.8	
Labour hold		Swing		

Old Warley
Party	Candidate	Votes	%	±%
Conservative	Terri Grainger	1,453	54.2	+10.6
Labour	Brian Caddick	1,228	45.8	+4.4
Majority		225	8.4	+6.2
Turnout		2,681	31.9	
Conservative gain from Labour		Swing		

Princes End
Party	Candidate	Votes	%	±%
BNP	John Salvage	754	37.0	+12.7
Labour	Elaine Giles	717	35.1	−5.5
Conservative	Margaret Dixon	365	17.9	−6.8
Freedom Party	Alison Aitken-Jones	135	6.6	+6.6
UKIP	Kevin Walker	69	3.4	+2.4
Majority		37	1.9	
Turnout		2,040	21.9	
BNP gain from Labour		Swing		

Rowley
Party	Candidate	Votes	%	±%
Labour	Iris Boucher	1,398	60.3	−5.4
Conservative	Joanne Hadley	859	37.1	+2.8
Socialist Labour	Amarjit Takhar	61	2.6	+2.6
Majority		539	23.3	−8.0
Turnout		2,318	24.5	
Labour hold		Swing		

St. Pauls
Party	Candidate	Votes	%	±%
Labour	Bawa Dhallu	1,467	52.6	−16.2
Socialist Labour	Hari Randhawa	860	30.8	+12.1
Conservative	Manjit Lall	461	16.5	+4.0
Majority		607	21.8	−28.3
Turnout		2,788	33.5	
Labour hold		Swing		

Smethwick
Party	Candidate	Votes	%	±%
Labour	Keith Davies	1,258	60.9	−16.2
Conservative	John Patterson	563	27.3	+4.4
Socialist Labour	Boota Singh	243	11.8	+11.8
Majority		695	33.7	−20.5
Turnout		2,064	24.4	
Labour hold		Swing		

Soho and Victoria
Party	Candidate	Votes	%	±%
Labour	Darren Cooper	995	73.1	+0.3
Conservative	Salahadin Adrwish	203	14.9	+3.7
Socialist Labour	Malcolm Connigale	163	12.0	−4.1
Majority		792	58.2	+1.5
Turnout		1,361	27.7	
Labour hold		Swing		

Tipton Green
Party	Candidate	Votes	%	±%
Labour	Syeda Khatun	1,724	42.0	−3.7
Freedom Party	Stephen Edwards	1,084	26.4	+2.3
Conservative	Ian Davies	633	15.4	+5.0
BNP	Terence Taylor	526	12.8	+5.3
Socialist Labour	Surinder Sandhu	134	3.3	−0.2
Majority		640	15.6	−6.0
Turnout		4,101	34.1	
Labour hold		Swing		

Tividale
Party	Candidate	Votes	%	±%
Labour	Maria Crompton	1,079	41.4	−9.0
BNP	Carl Butler	788	30.2	+30.2
Conservative	Steven Hockley	459	17.6	−10.7
Liberal Democrats	Diane Gorton	281	10.8	+0.5
Majority		291	11.2	−10.9
Turnout		2,607	27.2	
Labour hold		Swing		

Wednesbury North
Party	Candidate	Votes	%	±%
Conservative	Elaine Costigan	1,429	62.6	−6.0
Labour	Peter Allen	702	30.8	−0.6
Green	John Macefield	150	6.6	+6.6
Majority		727	31.9	−5.3
Turnout		2,281	24.8	
Conservative hold		Swing		

Wednesbury South
Party	Candidate	Votes	%	±%
Labour	George Turton	1,158	51.9	−6.8
Conservative	Jean Nugent	943	42.2	+0.9
Socialist Labour	Karam Singh	131	5.9	+5.9
Majority		215	9.6	−7.9
Turnout		2,232	24.7	
Labour hold		Swing		

West Bromwich Central
Party	Candidate	Votes	%	±%
Labour	Mohinder Tagger	1,338	54.7	−14.2
Conservative	Norman Lawley	593	24.2	+7.7
Liberal Democrats	Sandra Berisford	383	15.6	+4.9
Socialist Labour	Barinder Sandhu	134	5.5	+1.7
Majority		745	30.4	−22.0
Turnout		2,448	30.3	
Labour hold		Swing		
