= Erica Thomas =

American politician, b. 1987

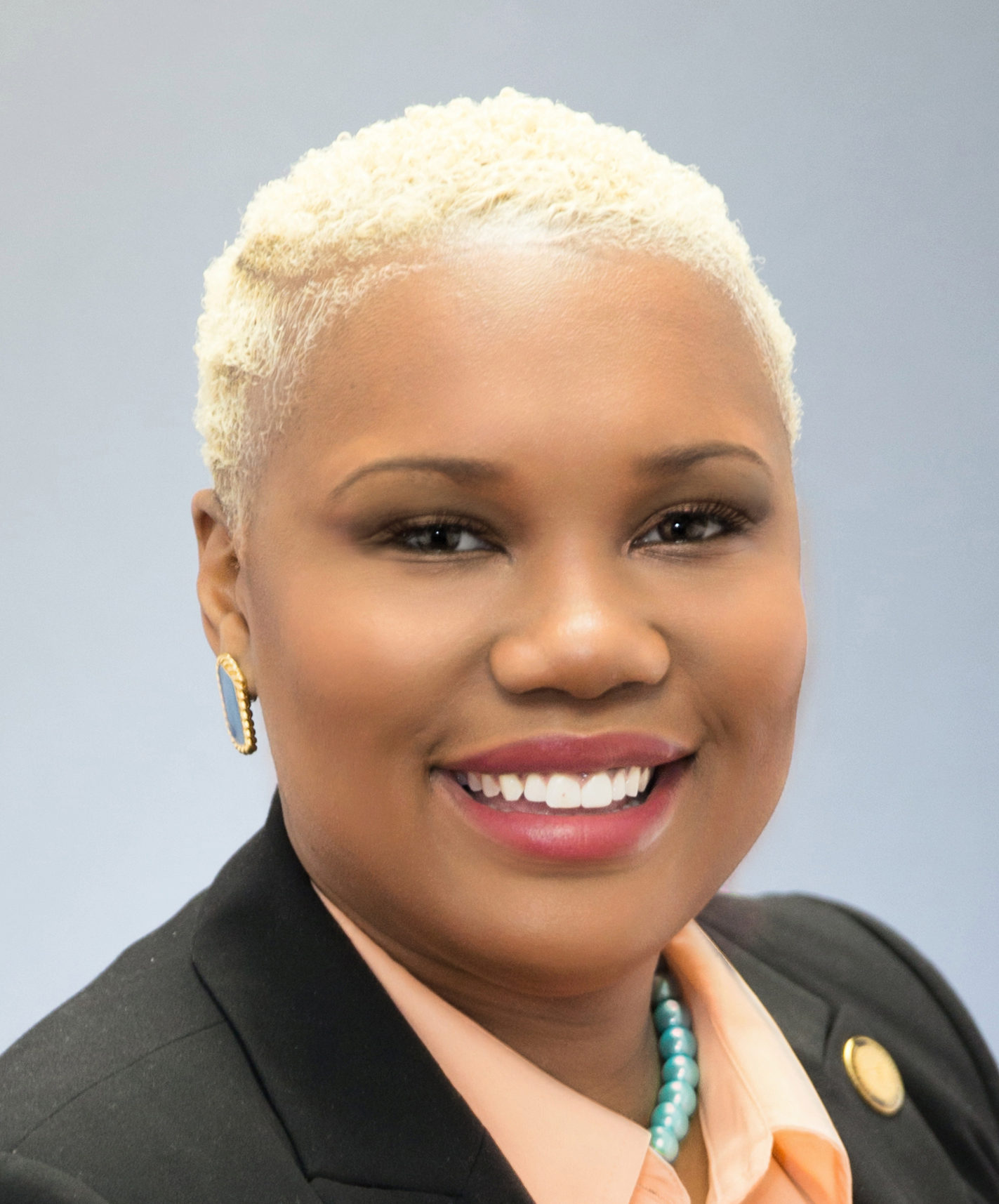

Member of the Georgia House of Representatives from the 39th district
- In office January 12, 2015 – January 9, 2023
- Preceded by: Alisha Thomas Morgan
- Succeeded by: Terry Cummings

Personal details
- Born: August 12, 1987 (age 39) Fayetteville, North Carolina
- Party: Democratic
- Spouse: Opeyemi Adeyemi
- Education: Oakwood University

Erica Renee Thomas (born August 12, 1987) is an American politician and youth leader. Thomas was the Georgia State Representative of District 39 from 2015 to 2023. She is also the founder of Speak Out Loud, a local nonprofit dedicated to giving a voice to foster children. She was recognized by the Georgia Center for Nonprofits (GCN), as a Nonprofit Leader and given the 30 under 30 Award for 2016.

== Early life and education ==
Thomas was born in Fayetteville, North Carolina, and she grew up in Knoxville, Tennessee. She studied at Carter High School, Cocke County High School, and Oakwood University.

== Career ==
=== Legislative service ===
Thomas first gained experience with the General Assembly serving as Legislative Aide to the previous representative from House District 39, she ran for the same office and won in 2014 when her predecessor went ahead to seek a higher office. She is currently serving her second term in office. She is currently serving on the Retirement, Budget and Fiscal Policy, Juvenile Justice and Science and Technology Committees.

In 2015, Thomas was a guest speaker at the Black Business Empowerment Convention of Georgia.

=== International development leadership and non-profit work ===
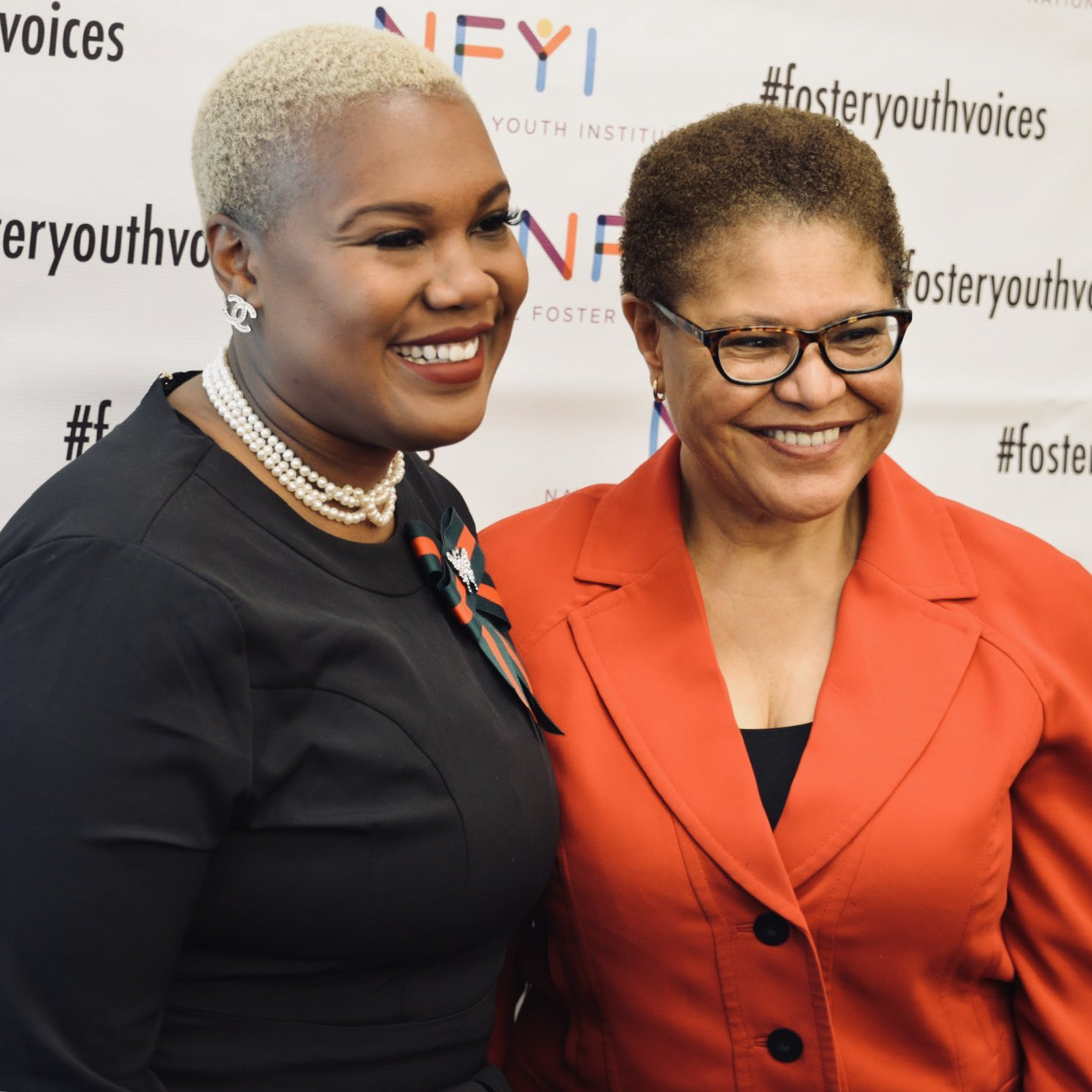
Thomas with Congresswoman Karen Bass in 2019.

Thomas runs Speak Out Loud, a local nonprofit she founded that is dedicated to providing a voice to foster children. The organization has expanded across the country and has chapters in Nigeria. She has also worked to establish libraries in various locations in Africa.

== Personal life ==
=== Incident at Publix ===
On July 19, 2019, Thomas alleged a man, Eric Sparkes, "degraded and berated" her while she was in line in a Publix. She stated that Sparkes told her to go back where she came from, a reference to a controversial and allegedly racist tweet by President Donald Trump. Thomas said that she feared for her life and later contacted police requesting the man be charged. Upon completion of their investigation, the Cobb County police announced no charges would be filed. A Publix employee told a Cobb County officer that she witnessed part of the conversation and heard Thomas “continuously tell Eric Sparkes to ‘Go back where you came from!’” but did not hear Sparkes utter those words to Thomas.

Sparkes, who said he is a Democrat and identifies as Cuban-American, denied making a racist comment. He stated that he was instead annoyed with Thomas for bringing too many groceries into the express checkout line. In a subsequent interview, Thomas said, "I don't know if he said 'go back,' or those types of words ... I don't know if he said 'go back to your country' or 'go back to where you came from,' but he was making those types of references is what I remember."

== Awards and honors ==
- 2013 Ambassador of Peace Award
- 100 Black Men of America's Image Award
- Atlanta Leading Ladies
- National Action Network Action and Authority award

Georgia House of Representatives
Preceded by Alisha Thomas Morgan	Member of the Georgia House of Representatives from the 39th district 2015–2023	Succeeded by Terry Cummings
