= Yael Poliavich =

Philanthropist and entrepreneur; co-founder of the Yael Foundation

- Born: Julia; 1982 (age 43–44); Kyrgyzstan
- Partner: Uri Poliavich
- Website: yaelpoliavich.com

Yael Poliavich (born 1982, Kyrgyzstan) is a philanthropist, entrepreneur, and co-founder of the Yael Foundation, a charitable organization supporting access to education for Jewish children worldwide.

The Foundation believes that all Jewish children, regardless of where they live or the size of their community, should have access to quality Jewish and general education. It works to ensure that no Jewish child is left without educational opportunities and is currently active in 37 countries, supporting 18,000 students.

== Biography ==
=== Early life and education ===
Yael Poliavich was born in 1982 in Kyrgyzstan. Her mother worked as a music teacher at the M. Abdraev Republican Secondary Special Boarding Music School in Bishkek. This early exposure to education influenced Poliavich's later interest in philanthropy and educational development.

From 1999 to 2004, she studied at The Academy of Public Administration under the President of the Kyrgyz Republic named after Zh. Abdrakhmanov earned a degree in Economics, Finance, and Credit. In 2012, she met Uri Poliavich, an entrepreneur and philanthropist, and moved from Kyrgyzstan to Moldova.

She worked as a finance professional until 2021, gaining experience in business operations, financial planning, and organizational management.

=== Conversion to Judaism and family ===
In 2020, she completed her conversion to Judaism, successfully passing the rabbinical examination in Ukraine under the supervision of Joseph Hanoch Brodbecker from Kyiv, Ukraine, a rabbi whose conversions are recognized by the Chief Rabbinate of Israel. She took the Hebrew name Yael. Following her conversion, she married Uri Poliavich in a Jewish ceremony.

== Yael Foundation ==
In 2020, Yael and her husband co-founded the Yael Foundation. The foundation is a philanthropic organisation focused on supporting access to education for Jewish children worldwide. It supports Jewish educational institutions, educators, and community programmes, with a focus on access to and development of Jewish and general education.

The Yael Foundation collaborates with philanthropic organisations, educators, and community leaders to support educational programmes and schools.

The foundation operates several programmes, including Yael Camp, a summer educational programme for children, and the Yael International Summit, an annual event for educators and community leaders. It also runs initiatives focused on teaching methods and school support, and presents an award recognising contributions to Jewish education.
