= Mableton, Georgia =

City in Georgia, United States

- City
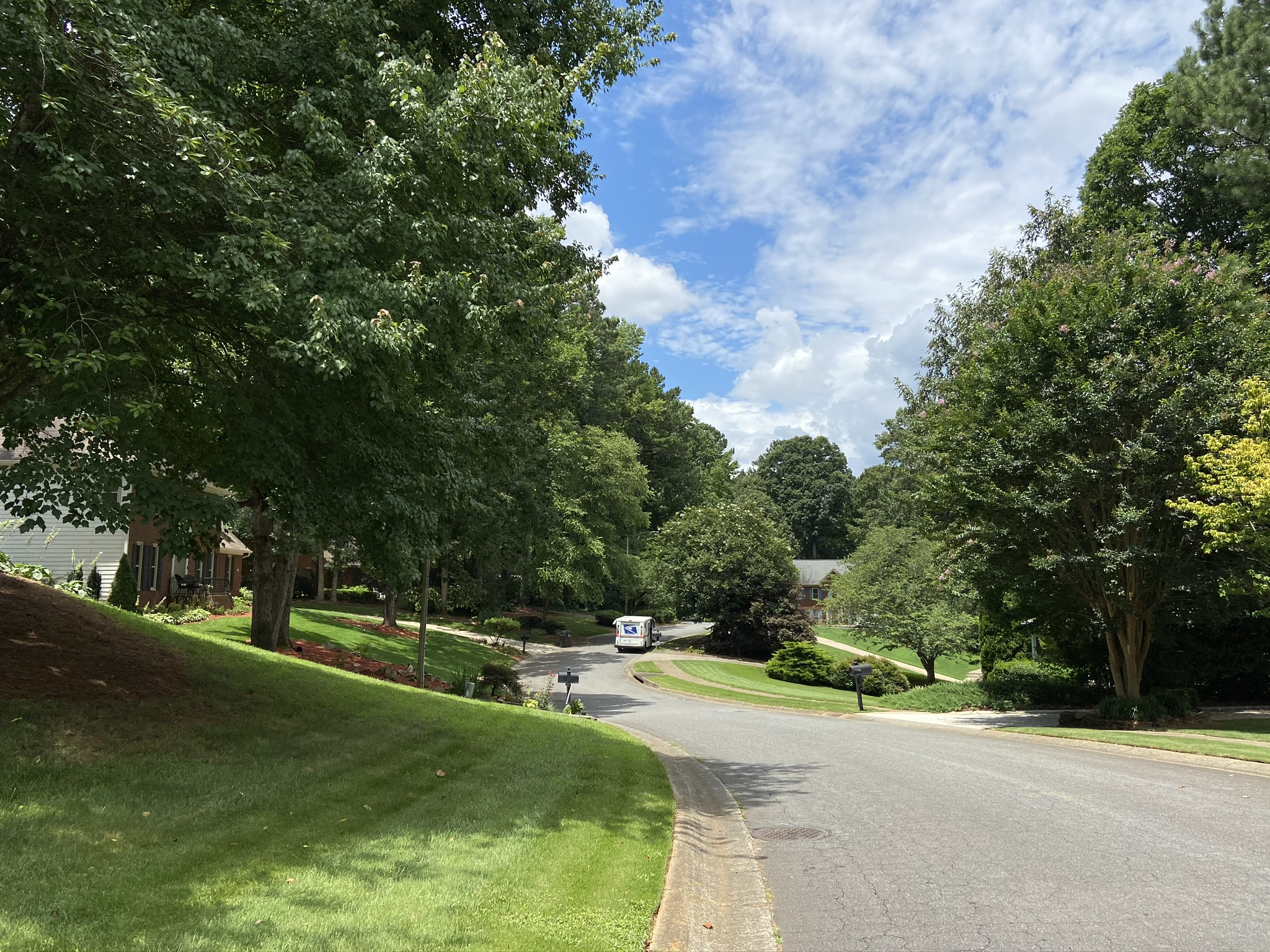
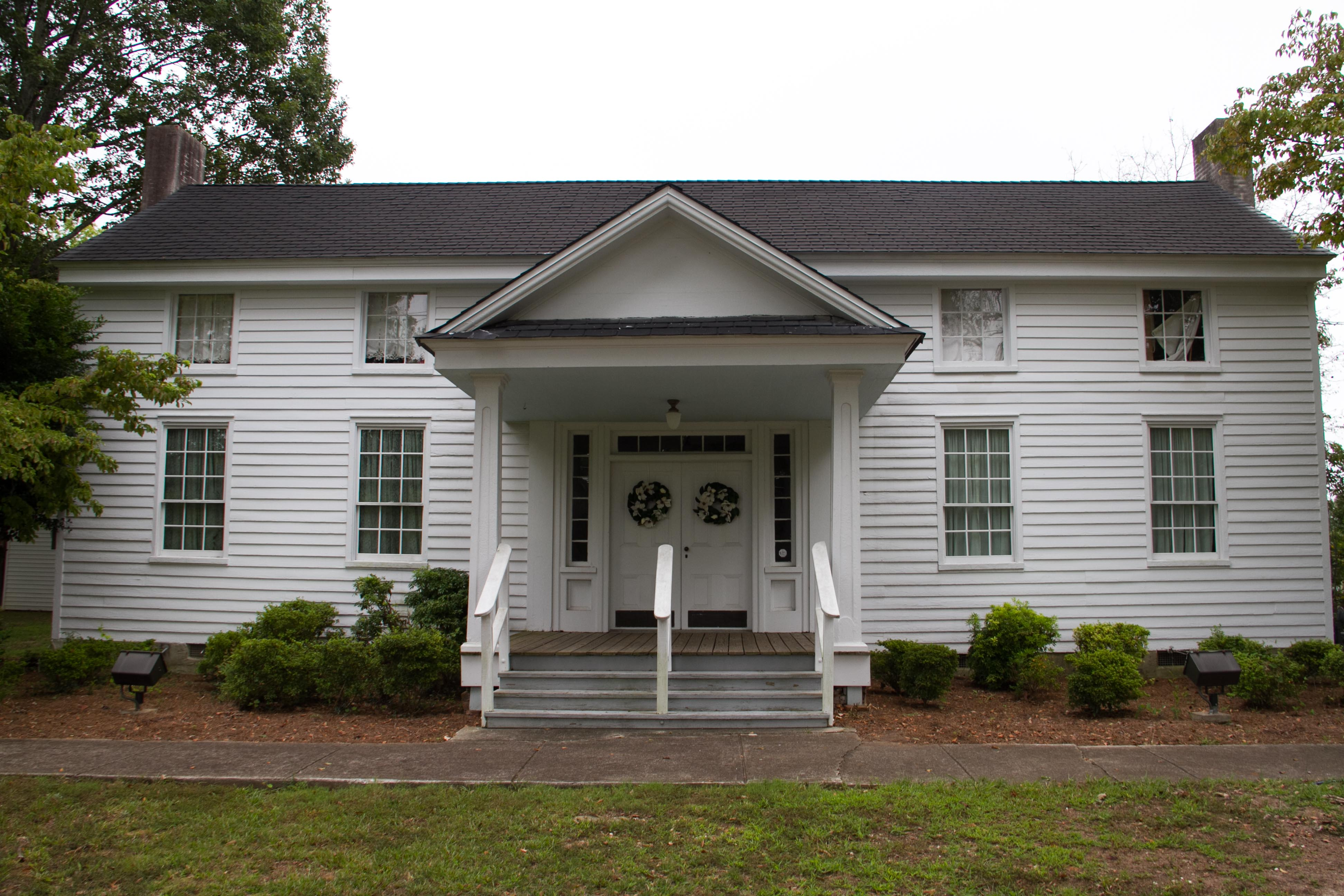
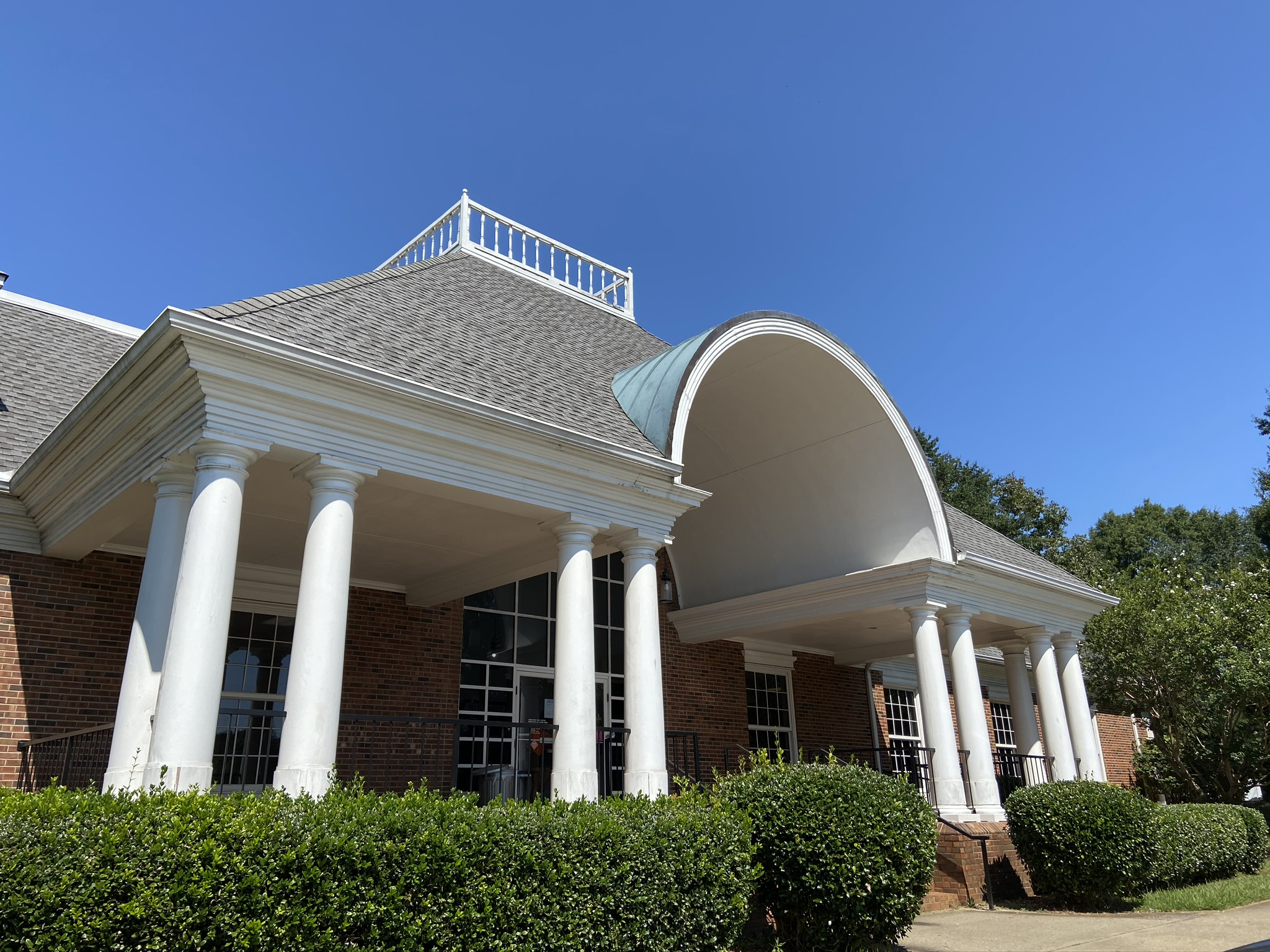
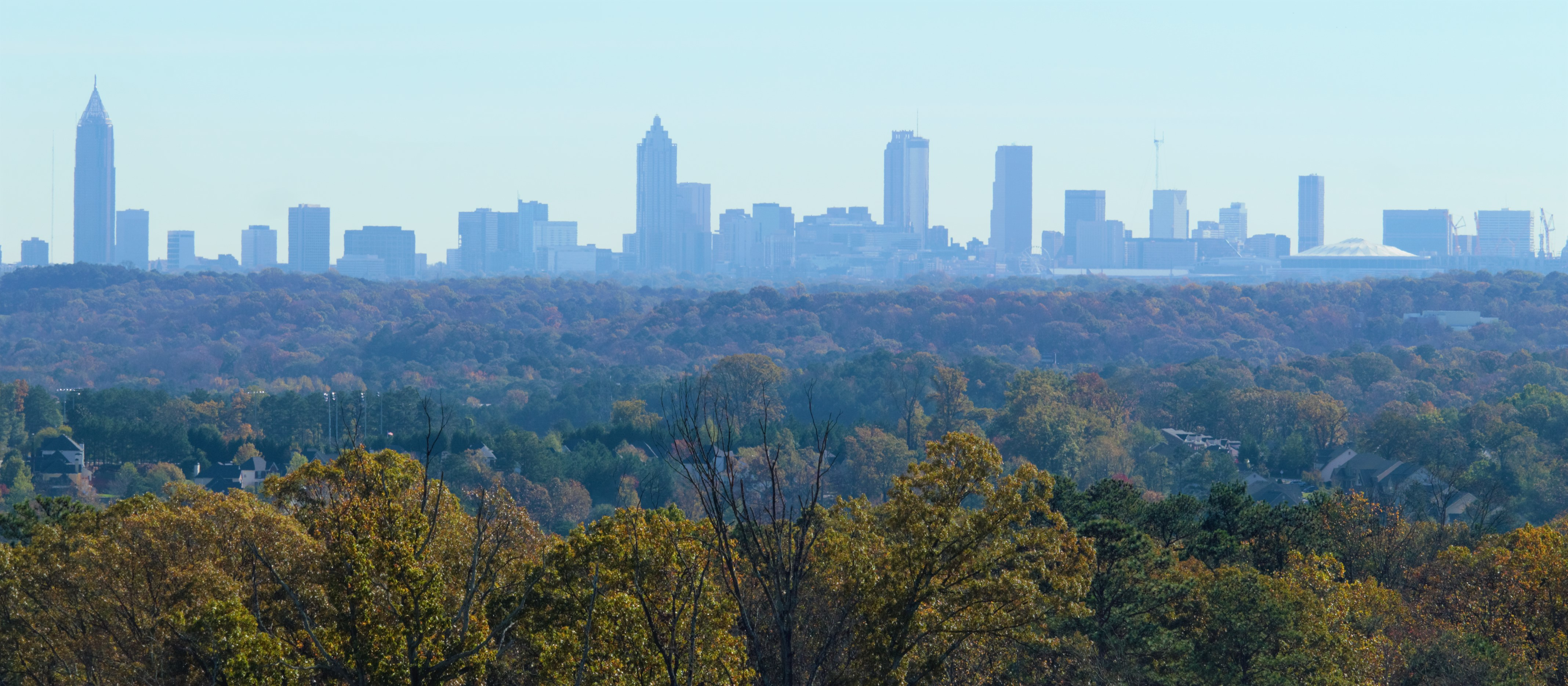
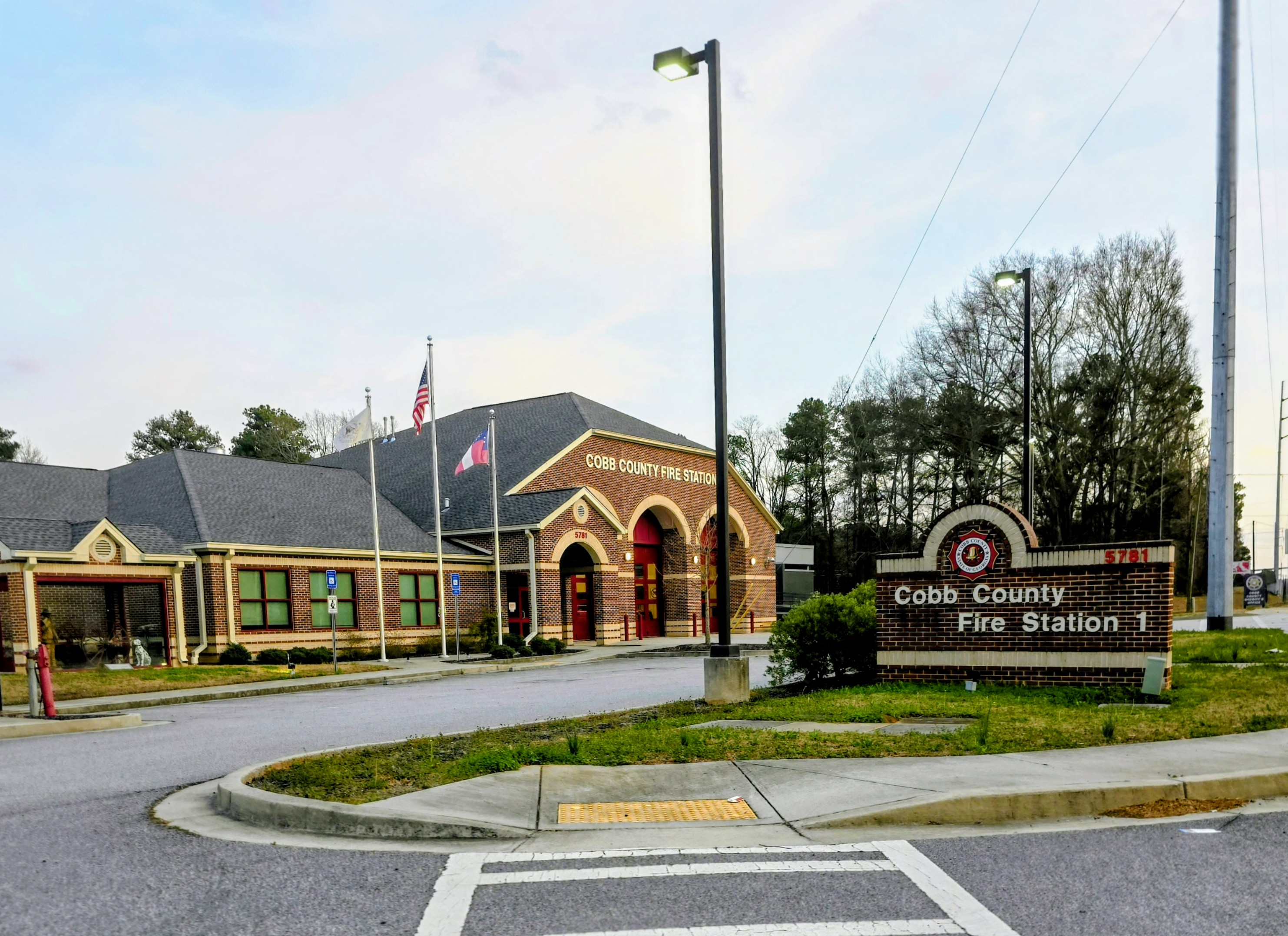
- Cobb County Fire Station #1 From top to bottom, left to right: a residential street in Mableton, Robert Mable's home built in 1843, the Mableton Post Office, the Atlanta skyline from Mt. Harmony Memorial Gardens in Mableton, Cobb County Fire Station 1

- Location in Cobb County and the state of Georgia

- Location within the Atlanta Metropolitan Area
- Coordinates: 33°49′06″N 84°34′34″W
- Country: United States
- State: Georgia
- County: Cobb
- Settled: September 11, 1843
- Incorporated (town): August 19, 1912
- Disincorporated: August 17, 1916
- Incorporated (city): May 11, 2023
- Founder: Robert Mable

Government
  - Mayor: Michael Owens (D)
  - District Commissioner: Monique Sheffield
  - Body: Cobb County Board of Commissioners

Area
  - Total: 36.6 sq mi (94.7 km^{2})
  - Land: 36.46 sq mi (94.43 km^{2})
  - Water: 0.10 sq mi (0.27 km^{2})
- Elevation: 978 ft (298 m)

Population (2020)
  - Total: 40,834
  - Density: 2,133.2/sq mi (823.65/km^{2})
- Time zone: UTC-5 (Eastern (EST))
  - Summer (DST): UTC-4 (EDT)
- ZIP code: 30126
- Area codes: 770; 678, 470, and 943
- FIPS code: 13-48288
- GNIS feature ID: 0332295
- Website: mableton.gov

Mableton (/ˈmeɪbəltən/ MAY-bəl-tən) is a city in Cobb County, Georgia, United States. Voters of the unincorporated area of Mableton approved a referendum to incorporate on November 8, 2022, and six council members were elected on March 21, 2023, with Michael Owens elected as mayor of Mableton in the 2023 Mableton mayoral election. According to the 2020 census, the census-designated area Mableton had a population of 40,834.

== History ==
=== Early history (1843–1912) ===
Between the 16th and 19th centuries, most of the land in present-day southern Cobb County belonged to the Cherokee and Creek. Two Native American villages were established near the area that will later become known as Mableton - the settlements of Sweet Water Town and Nickajack. Both tribes coinhabited the area peacefully, with one legend claiming that eventual ownership of the area by the Cherokee was settled via a ball game. One of the early known records of white Europeans being aware of the inhabitants is an 1839 map depicting a 'Nickajack Creek' converging with the Chattahoochee River south and west of the Standing Peachtree settlement.

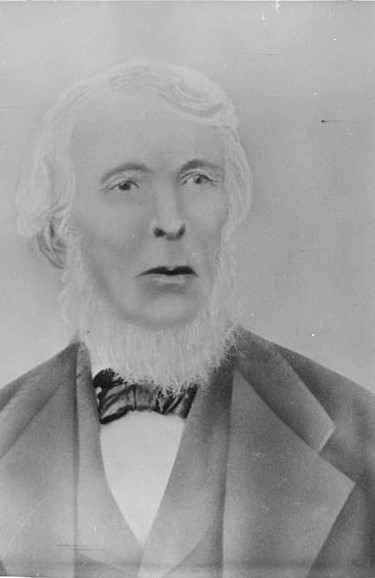
Robert Mable

The town was named after Scottish immigrant Robert Mable (October 18, 1803 – July 7, 1885), who on September 11, 1843, bought 300 acres (approximately 120 hectares or 1.2 km^{2}) of land in southern Cobb County from the Georgia Land Lottery of 1832. Mable was a millwright and farmer who grew cotton, corn, potatoes, and sorghum in the area; he owned between 11 and 48 slaves by 1860. According to oral interviews, Mable was a "fair and kind" enslaver who educated slave children alongside his own, and eventually also liberated his slaves before any government mandate ordered him to. The Robert Mable House and Cemetery, located off U.S. 78 on Floyd Road just north of Clay Road, now includes an amphitheater which hosts public events.

More white settlers moved into the northern edge of Mableton by Nickajack Creek, near Smyrna, in the mid-1800s. They formed a community initially known as Mill Grove and later Nickajack. The creek provided ample power to run grist, saw, cotton, and woolen mills. A covered bridge, originally built c. 1848–1850, traverses the stream and is now part of a historical district. It is one of the few remaining covered bridges in Georgia, and still highly active today after it was later buttressed to handle automobile traffic. A notable resident of the area during that period was John Gann, Cobb County's first state senator. His home, built in 1841, still stands today and is also part of the historical district.

During the Atlanta campaign of the Civil War, Union officers Walter Q. Gresham and Francis P. Blair Jr. of the XVII Corps reached Mableton on July 3, 1864, after the Union defeat at Kennesaw. Gresham replenished his troops' supplies and received medical care at Robert Mable's house, and camped for the night before advancing to Atlanta. The house was spared from the carnage of Sherman's March to the Sea.

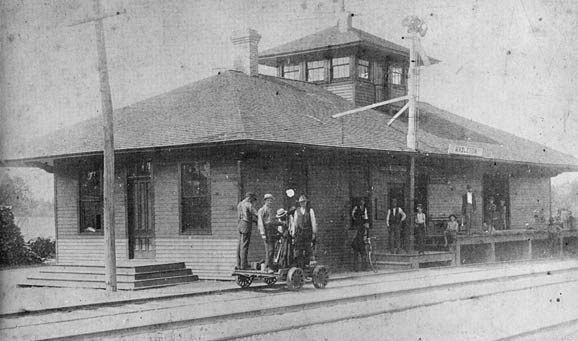
The Mableton train depot, constructed 1881

The Georgia Pacific Railway (later absorbed by Southern Railway and today known as the Norfolk Southern Railway) opened a railroad station in Mableton in December 1881. The chief engineer erected a sign displaying 'Mableton' upon completion of the station in honor of Robert. The first train from Atlanta arrived at the station just before Christmas. Shortly after, the post office was established on June 28, 1882. This replaced the post office in Bryantville, a former settlement about two miles (3.2 km) southeast. The arrival of the railroad allowed Mableton to act as a commercial hub for then-rural Cobb County. Cotton export flourished throughout the county from the 1890s until the Great Depression.

=== Original incorporation (1912–1916) ===
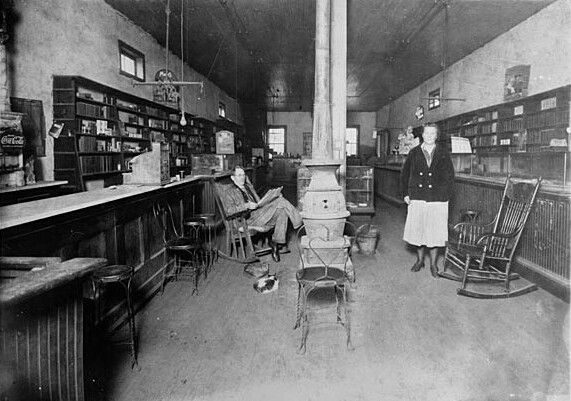
Homer A. Glore and his wife in Mableton Drug Store and Post Office in 1925

On August 19, 1912, Mableton was incorporated as a town but was disincorporated on August 17, 1916. In that year, the town suffered from a heavy flood that overwhelmed its sewer system, resulting in an unexpected tax burden being placed upon the residents for repairs. But after locals successfully demanded that a tax on storm drains be shared by all of Cobb County instead, the town's charter was revoked and Mableton was disincorporated. Homer A. Glore, a medical doctor served as the first mayor of Mableton.

=== Restored municipality (2023–) ===
In 2020, a local initiative known as the South Cobb Alliance fostered a debate for cityhood. A feasibility study conducted by the Carl Vinson Institute of Government stated that the potential city would generate $11.3 million in operating expenses and $14.6 million in revenue. Alternatively, nearby Smyrna considered annexing parts of Mableton. This move would have made Smyrna the largest city in Cobb County, surpassing the county seat of Marietta, and would have ultimately disrupted Mableton's cityhood efforts.

Following the 2022 midterm elections, a referendum on cityhood was passed, with 13,162 in favor of Mableton's cityhood and 11,675 rejecting it. The majority of no votes were concentrated in the north of Mableton, where household income is higher. Human resources director Mark Sette said it was a "power grab" to annex unincorporated areas of north Mableton to "pay for all of the projects that they want down there [in south Mableton]". Thousands of people signed a petition to de-annex areas that voted no from the city. Mableton was different in that the supporters of de-annexation were multi-racial and multi-generational while organizers of similar secession movements tended to be mainly older white residents.

It is the largest city in Cobb County in terms of population, with the new city incorporating about 47,000 residents. The city limits also include areas of unincorporated Smyrna and Austell.

The City of Mableton was approved by the voters in a referendum on the General Election Ballot on November 8, 2022.

Mableton was the only one of four proposed new cities in Metro Atlanta to be approved; the other three, East Cobb, Lost Mountain and Vinings, all failed to be incorporated as municipalities in referendums. In May 2022, Brentin Mock of Bloomberg News described the city movement in Metro Atlanta as being "defeated". Though Mock reported that Mableton was different as it was the only one out of the four to have a majority non-white population and is assembling around "principles of diversity, affordability and inclusive voting rights". Politically, Mableton is in Cobb County whose board of commissioners was majority white and Republican for most of its history, until 2020 when it became majority black and Democrat. According to a preliminary analysis from Cobb County, the incorporation of Mableton would result in a net annual loss of $8 million from the city's budget after accounting for the services that the county would no longer provide for it.

The referendum was the result of the General Assembly's passage of House Bill (HB-839), which set the boundaries of the city, established city council districts, and laid out the powers of the Mayor and Council. The law also established March 21, 2023, as the date for a special election for the first council members and mayor of Mableton.

=== De-annexation calls ===
Michael Owens stated that he was not against de-annexation but that his focus was on the majority of Mableton residents who wish to be in the city. LaTonia Long and Michael Murphy both opposed de-annexation. Mayoral candidate Aaron Carman said that he supported the people involved in the de-annexation effort but stated that if the de-annexation efforts do not pass, Mableton needed someone that could "bring the city together". State representative David Wilkerson submitted two de-annexation bills that would have allowed some areas to de-annex from Mableton but both failed in the Georgia General Assembly. A compromise bill in response to the bills submitted by Wilkerson was drafted by state representatives Terry Cummings and Michael Smith but this also failed as it was not published in time.

=== 2023 mayoral election ===
The 2023 Mableton mayoral election took place on March 21, 2023, in Mableton, with a runoff held on April 18, 2023, as no candidate got 50% of the vote in the general election. Aaron Carman gained the most votes in the first round but lost the runoff to former Cobb County Democratic Committee chair Michael Owens who became the first mayor of Mableton, Georgia in over 100 years. Despite the runoff election being described as historic, only 6,113 votes were cast and voter turnout was low at 12.9% of 47,200 registered voters.

== Geography ==
Mableton is located at 33°49′06″N 84°34′34″W (33.818333, -84.576111). The Chattahoochee River acts as the southeast border, separating Cobb County from west Fulton County — where the historic African-American neighborhood of Collier Heights and the former site of the Bankhead Courts housing project are nearby. Two suburban cities directly border Mableton: Austell in the west and Smyrna in the north. Lithia Springs, an unincorporated community, is directly southwest.

Mableton is approximately 15 miles west-northwest from the city of Atlanta, and approximately 20 miles from Hartsfield-Jackson Atlanta International Airport.

== Demographics ==
Historical population
Census	Pop.	Note	%±
1960	7,127		—
1980	24,894		—
1990	25,137		1.0%
2000	29,733		18.3%
2010	37,115		24.8%
2020	40,834		10.0%
2025 (est.)	78,820	▲	93.0%
U.S. Decennial Census; 1850-1870 1870-1880; 1890-1910 1920-1930; 1940 1950 1960; 1970 1980 1990; 2000 2010 2020; 2025

Mableton appeared as an unincorporated place in the 1960 U.S. census. It was not listed in the 1970 U.S. census. It was listed as a census designated place in the 1980 United States census. Note: The 2020 U.S. Census population data is for Mableton's boundaries as a Census Designated Place (CDP) prior to its 2022 incorporation. The larger 37 square mile city limits are used in the U.S. Census' 2025 estimates, therefore explaining the large jump in population.

=== 2020 census ===
Mableton, Georgia – racial and ethnic composition Note: the US Census treats Hispanic/Latino as an ethnic category. This table excludes Latinos from the racial categories and assigns them to a separate category. Hispanics/Latinos may be of any race.
Race / ethnicity (NH = Non-Hispanic)	Pop. 2000	Pop. 2010	Pop. 2020	% 2000	% 2010	% 2020
White alone (NH)	17,165	14,090	10,944	57.73%	37.96%	26.80%
Black or African American alone (NH)	8,633	14,424	17,982	29.04%	38.86%	44.04%
Native American or Alaska Native alone (NH)	72	101	61	0.24%	0.27%	0.15%
Asian alone (NH)	401	810	677	1.35%	2.18%	1.66%
Native Hawaiian or Pacific Islander alone (NH)	3	6	7	0.01%	0.02%	0.02%
Other race alone (NH)	112	113	271	0.38%	0.30%	0.66%
Mixed race or Multiracial (NH)	432	707	1,455	1.45%	1.90%	3.56%
Hispanic or Latino (any race)	2,915	6,864	9,437	9.80%	18.49%	23.11%
Total	29,733	37,115	40,834	100.00%	100.00%	100.00%

=== 2000 census ===
As of the census of 2000, there were 11,339 housing units at an average density of 550.8 per square mile (212.7/km^{2}). There were 10,894 households, out of which 34.9% had children under the age of 18 living with them, 53.5% were married couples living together, 14.5% had a female householder with no husband present, and 26.9% were non-families. 21.2% of all households were made up of individuals, and 6.7% had someone living alone who was 65 years of age or older. The average household size was 2.72 and the average family size was 3.12.

== Government ==
Mableton, Georgia was incorporated as a city on August 19, 1912, before being disincorporated on August 17, 1916, as a result of a flood overwhelming the city's sewer system. In November 2023, the city was reincorporated in an election.

The mayor is the highest elected official in the city. The current mayor is Michael Owens, who was elected in the 2023 Mableton mayoral election.

=== 1912–1916 ===
#	Mayor	Term start	Term end
1	Homer A. Glore	1912	1913
2	W.H. Stroud	1913	????

=== 2023–present ===
#	Image	Mayor	Term start	Term end	Terms	Party
1		Michael Owens	2023	Incumbent	1	Democratic

== Transportation ==
The public-use, general aviation Fulton County Airport (Brown Field) is adjacent to Mableton's southeast border with Fulton County. It includes two runways and handles approximately 65,000 operations annually..

The public transportation is provided by a Cobblinc which is a public transit services owned and operated by Cobb County. Cobblinc routes 25 and 30 services throughout all the city of Mableton

== Recreation ==
Six Flags Over Georgia, a theme park, is in Mableton.

=== Trails ===
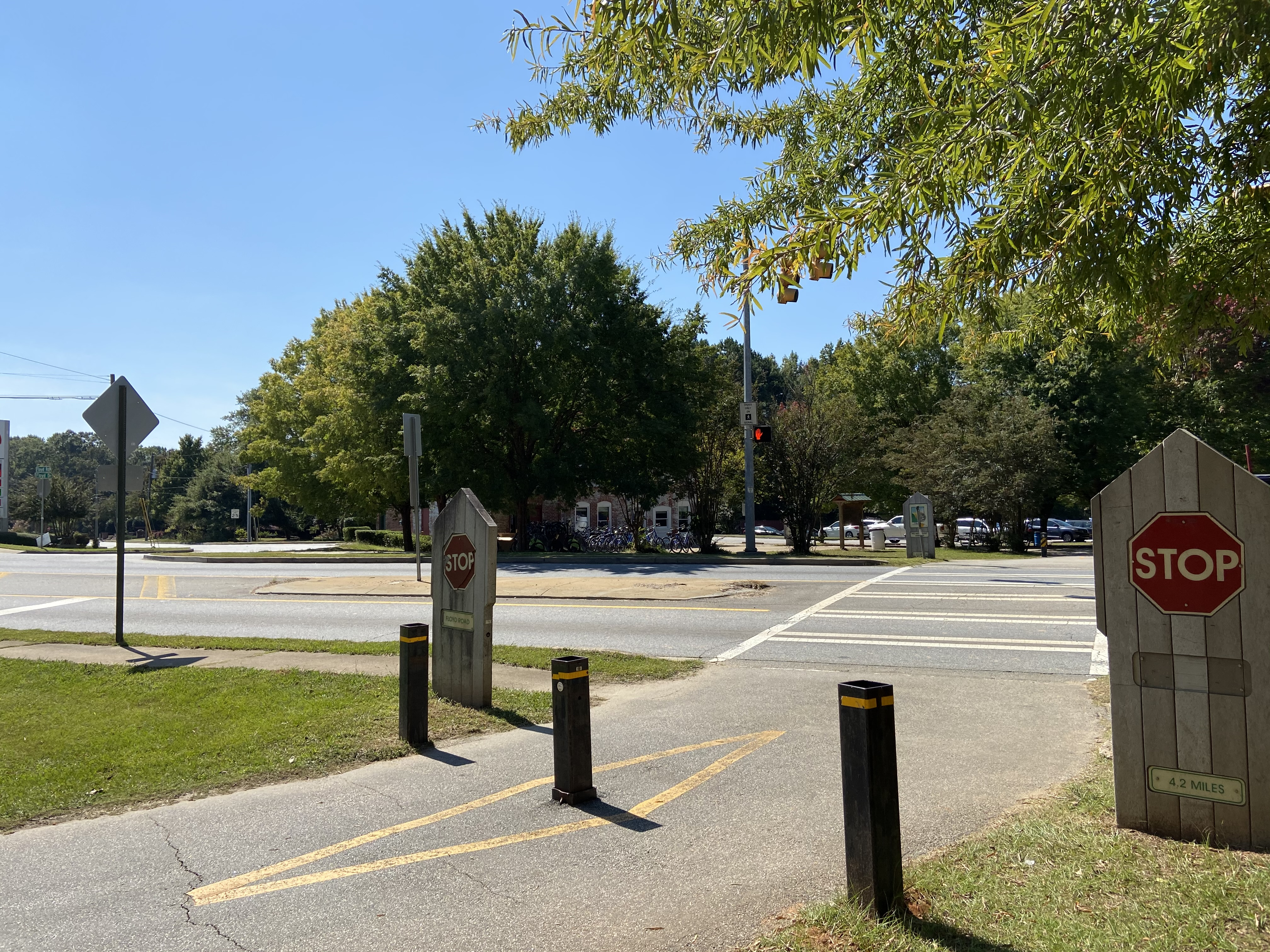
The Silver Comet Trail intersecting Floyd Road in Mableton

The Silver Comet Trail runs through Mableton. It is a 61.5 mile paved trail with a 2% grade, beginning in Smyrna and ending at the Georgia-Alabama state line near Cedartown, GA.

== Education ==
The Cobb County School District operates several public schools in the area:

=== Elementary schools ===
- Mableton Elementary School
- Clay-Harmony Leland Elementary School
- Bryant Elementary School
- Riverside Elementary School
- H.A.V.E.N. Academy at Skyview
- Russell Elementary School
- City View Elementary School

=== Middle schools ===
- Floyd Middle School
- Garrett Middle School
- Lindley Middle School
- Betty Gray Middle School

=== High school ===
- Pebblebrook High School – famous alumni include Glee actress Becca Tobin, Los Angeles Lakers player Collin Sexton, and rapper Lil Yachty
- South Cobb High School

=== Private schools ===
The Georgia Japanese Language School (GJLS; ジョージア日本語学校 Jōjia Nihongo Gakkō), a part-time supplementary Japanese school, holds its classes at the former Lindley 6th Grade Academy (now Betty Gray Middle School) in Mableton; Lindley was previously occupied by the W. H. Barnes Education Center. The GJLS originally opened with nine students in 1974 at Oglethorpe University, serving grades 1 through 9. The school moved to W.H. Barnes in 2002.

Whitefield Academy, a Christian college preparatory school in Smyrna, is near Mableton.

The SAE School is an "independent project-based learning school" for pre-school to 8th grade students located in Mableton.

Primrose Schools, a private school for early preschool children, is in the Providence neighborhood of Mableton.

=== Public library ===
- Cobb County Public Library System: South Cobb Regional Library

== Redevelopment ==
In the summer of 2010, more than a hundred residents, bureaucrats, politicians, architects, designers and traffic engineers spent a week designing a vision for a redeveloped downtown Mableton. It was then formalized by Duany Plater-Zyberk into a plan that was unanimously approved by Cobb County's Board of Commissioners in 2013. The establishment of the new Mableton Town Center (MTC) is part of the county's 2040 Comprehensive Plan.

A rendering of the proposed mixed-use development along Mableton Parkway

As of late 2020, Embry Development Company is in talks with the Cobb County Board of Commissioners to begin construction of a 31-acre mixed-use commercial/residential plaza at Mableton Parkway and Old Powder Springs Road. The development calls for 81 town homes, 46 "courtyard cottage" style houses, 21 detached single-family homes, and 13,500 square feet of retail and restaurant space. The particular area, in addition to establishments along Veterans Memorial Highway (U.S. 78), is largely dated and rundown, with some businesses failing to adhere to building codes.

Another company, Garner Group, is also redeveloping a nearly 40 year old strip mall along Floyd Road and East-West Connector into a mixed-use, pedestrian-friendly plaza. There will be 360 luxury apartments and 42 townhomes on the 60-acre site, with the entire development occupying about 720,000 square feet. Planning Commission Chair Galt Porter, proponent of the plan, stated of the recent growth in the area: "It's probably been 15 to 20 years since there's been a market rate development of apartments anywhere close to this...you have to go to Smyrna to get something, or you have to go out all the way into Powder Springs to get something. There's just nothing in this area." The project was approved by the Cobb County Board of Commissioners on October 21, 2020.

== Notable people ==
- Chloe Bailey, actress and singer
- Halle Bailey, actress and singer
- Roy Barnes, 80th governor of Georgia from 1999–2003, the most recent Democrat to hold the office until Keisha Lance Bottoms in 2026
- Anna Benson, glamour model
- Ronnie DeVoe, member of New Edition
- AR Fox, pro wrestler
- T. J. Holmes, CNN news anchor
- Austin Kelly, basketball coach
- Michael King, television producer/reporter and commentator
- Kenny McKinley, former wide receiver for Denver Broncos
- Kenny Selmon, track and field athlete competing in the 2020 Tokyo Summer Olympics
- Collin Sexton, basketball player for the Utah Jazz
- Erica Thomas, Georgia state representative
- Lil Yachty, rapper and singer
