= One World Youth Project =

Youth organization

- Formation: 2004
- Type: Youth organization
- Legal status: Non-profit organization
- Purpose: Youth empowerment Youth engagement Youth-adult partnership
- Headquarters: Massachusetts
- Location: United States
- Region served: International
- President & Founder: Jessica Rimington
- Website: Home page

One World Youth Project (OWYP) is a non-profit 501(c)(3) corporation founded in Massachusetts. Its goal is to create a more knowledgeable, compassionate, skilled, and understanding generation of global citizens while at the same time, inspiring youths to take effective action now.

== Origin ==
The Massachusetts, United States based organization was founded in 2004, by Jessica Rimington, who at the time was 18 years old.

== Program ==
OWYP is a sister-school program for middle and high school students, linking groups in North America, with groups from around the world in learning partnerships for the purpose of community service toward the achievement of the United Nations Millennium Development Goals. The OWYP educational program allows youth to explore and better understand their own community, while learning about the community of their sister-group overseas. Each sister-group pair is assigned one of the United Nations Millennium Development Goals on which to focus their yearlong study and communication. Each sister-group ultimately takes action on their UN Millennium Development Goal through a local service project. Over 60 schools were paired in OWYP's first four years.

== See also ==
- List of youth empowerment organizations
- Youth work
- Mature minor doctrine
- International Youth Change Maker
- Positive youth development
