= International Youth Change Maker =

Organization

International youth change maker
- ইন্টারন্যাশনাল ইয়ুথ চেইঞ্জ মেকার
- Founded: 2012
- Type: Non Profit Organization
- Region served: Worldwide
- Website: www.iycmbd.org

International Youth Change Maker is a Bangladeshi volunteer organization that monitors the rights of children and youth, ensures the basic rights of street children, ensures youth reproductive health services, addresses critical challenges in sustainable development, campaigns and climate change fights and promotes the development of the climate through worldwide work.

== History ==
In 2012, the organization officially started its work by establishing a committee in Barisal district with 15 founding members. Currently the organization is active in 20 districts of Bangladesh and has more than 40,000 registered members in Bangladesh and more than 600 international ambassadors in 75 countries around the world. The organization is committed to the development of all children and young people in the world. She wants to create a world without war. She also works to protect the world from climate threats and make the world child and youth friendly.

In 10 years (as of 2020), about 1.5 million people have participated in the various activities of IYCM. IYCM wants to make Bangladesh a country free of street children by 2030 and to be a climate protection role model. The organization works to protect the rights of 3 million people, children and youth, by engaging them in the life skills program.

== Awards ==
- Bangladesh Digital Social Innovation Awards 2021.
- World Peace Prize 2022 Sweden
- Global Youth Symposia & Awards 2022
- Best Youth Organization

== See also ==
- List of youth empowerment organizations
- One World Youth Project
- Youth work
- Mature minor doctrine
- Positive youth development
