= Michael Owens (politician) =

American politician (born 1974/75)

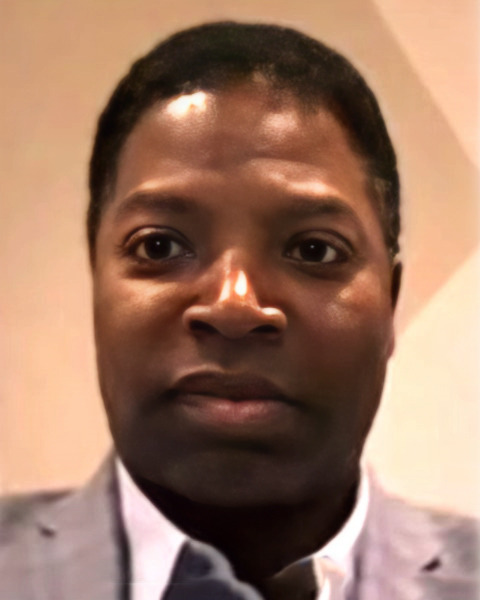
- Owens in 2019

Mayor of Mableton
- Incumbent
- Assumed office April 21, 2023
- Preceded by: Office established

Chair of the Cobb County Democratic Committee
- In office 2016–2019
- State chair: DuBose Porter
- Preceded by: Melissa Pike
- Succeeded by: Jacquelyn Bettadapur

Personal details
- Born: 1974 or 1975 (age 51–52)
- Party: Democratic
- Children: 5
- Website: Mayoral Campaign Website

Michael Owens is an American politician serving as mayor of Mableton, Georgia, the largest city in Cobb County since defeating Aaron Carman in the runoff of the 2023 Mableton mayoral election. He previously served as Chair of the Cobb County Democratic Committee from 2016 to 2019.

== Early life and career ==
Owens was raised in Robbins, North Carolina. His grandparents lived in Cobb County, while his grandfather and father were both born in Columbus, Ohio. Owens said that his relatives resided "up and down Veterans Memorial", at the time known as Bankhead Highway. Owens served in the United States Marine Corps for eight years mainly in communications. He also did some combat engineering and training in counterterrorism before going to a boot camp in Parris Island and an officer school in Quantico. He received his doctorate of business administration in global business and leadership from the California Intercontinental University and worked as a business information security officer with consumer credit reporting agency Equifax.

In the 2014 United States House of Representatives elections, he unsuccessfully challenged incumbent David Scott in the Democratic primary for Georgia's 13th congressional district. From 2016 to 2019, he served as Chair of the Cobb County Democratic Committee. In the 2020 United States House of Representatives elections, he unsuccessfully challenged Scott again in the Democratic primary for Georgia's 13th congressional district. He unsuccessfully sought the Democratic nomination in the 2022 Georgia Secretary of State election in which he was endorsed by former Georgia governor Roy Barnes and senator Michael Rhett.

== Mayor of Mableton ==
In March 2023, he announced he was running for mayor of Mableton in the 2023 Mableton mayoral election in which he was again endorsed by Roy Barnes who grew up in Mableton. He was elected with 55.68% of the vote and became the city's first mayor in over 100 years.

In July 2023, Owens and the city council attended a three-day training and orientation session at the headquarters of the Georgia Municipal Association. He also succeeded Mayor of Marietta Steve Tumlin as a member of the Cobb & Douglas County Board of Health.

== Personal life ==
Owens has five children and lives in Mableton, Georgia.
