= Homer A. Glore =

American medical doctor and politician

Mayor of Mableton
- In office 1912–1913
- Preceded by: Office established
- Succeeded by: W.H. Stroud

Personal details
- Born: Homer Alonzo Glore; 1874
- Died: 1944 (aged 69–70)
- Spouse: Ida Elizabeth Dodgen
- Children: 3
- Education: Atlanta Medical College

Homer Alonzo Glore (1874–1944) was an American medical doctor and politician who served as the first mayor of Mableton, Georgia when it was incorporated in 1912. He also served as postmaster of the Mableton Drug Store and Post Office from 1921 to 1938.

== Ancestry ==
The Glore family history in the United States can be traced back to Virginia, when in 1717, Michael Glore arrived on a ship from Holland. Homer's paternal grandfather Abram Glore built a log cabin in DeKalb County before moving to Cobb County where he built a second log cabin which was awarded to someone else in the Gold Lottery of 1832. He built a third log cabin in 1841 which he, his wife Tabitha and his ten children moved into in 1841.

== Early life and career ==
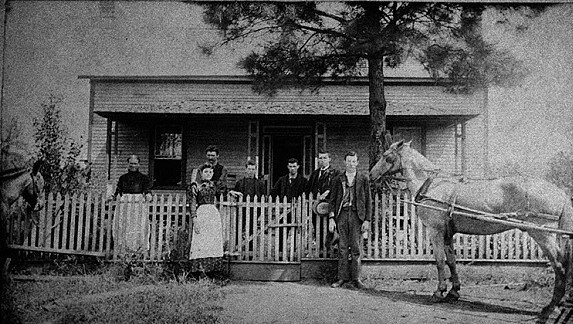
Left to right: Mary Glore, Alice Daniell, Robert Daniell, Forrest Daniell, unknown, Honor Glore and Homer Glore in 1894

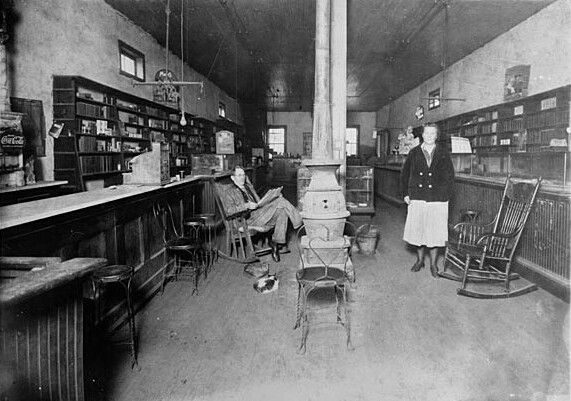
Glore and his wife at the second building the Mableton Drug Store and Post Office was located in 1925

Homer Alonzo Glore was born in 1874 to James Robert Glore and his wife Mary Frances Alexander Glore. His father was notable for being the first white child born in the Cherokee village of Sweetwater. Glore had a younger brother called Honor M. Glore and a sister called Alice Glore who married Robert E. Daniell and had eight children. Glore graduated from Atlanta Medical College in 1896 and became a medical doctor. He opened his first drug store in Mableton, Georgia in 1911.

=== Mayor of Mableton ===
Mableton was incorporated on August 19, 1912 and the legislation incorporating the city stated that the municipal government of the town be vested in a mayor and four councilmen who had to be bona fide residents of said town for six months preceding their election to office. It also stated that the regular term of office for the mayor and councilmen was one year. Glore was elected as the first mayor of Mableton which had a population of about 200. Glore did not seek reelection and was succeeded by W.H. Stroud. On August 17, 1916, the town's charter was repealed and Mableton was disincorporated.

=== Postmaster at Mableton ===
In 1921, Glore became the postmaster at the Mableton Drug Store and Post Office. In 1924, the Mableton Drug Store and Post Office was relocated to a new building that had served as T.J. Lowe, Jr. General Store and Post Office from 1897 to 1921. Glore was the postmaster at Mableton for over 16 years until 1938, when he resigned due to ill health. After his resignation the building fell into disuse. The building is known to have been still standing but in need of repair in the early 1950s but the current status of the building is not known.

== Personal life ==
He and his wife Ida Elizabeth Dodgen had three children: Cecil Utilla Glore (1896–1978), Homer Alonzo Glore (1901–1976) and Louis Harold Glore (1909–1991) who was known as Harold. Homer died in 1944. Ida died of a heart attack on July 18, 1947.

Cecil was a teacher at Mableton Grammar School and married Roy Franklin Daniell in 1916, they had no children. Homer was an attorney for the Atlanta and West Point Railroad. Harold was an attorney for the Pullman Company from 1930 to 1946 before becoming a law assistant to the Supreme Court of Georgia from 1948 to 1960 and working in private law practice from 1960 until his retirement in 1985. The brothers had a law firm together in Mableton called Glore & Glore and both were members of the Cobb County Bar Association, Georgia Bar Association and Old War Horse Lawyers Club. Harold would later write a book about the history of his family and Mableton and upon his death he had no surviving immediate relatives.

== Sources ==
- State of Georgia (1916). Acts and Resolutions of the General Assembly.
- Williams, Clara Daniell (1979). Daniell Family History: Volume 1.
- Few, Mary Dodgen (1985). The Dodgen Story: An Account of a Truly American Family. Southern Historical Press. ISBN 9780893085476.
- Paden, Rebecca Nash; McTyre, Joe (2005). Cobb County. Arcadia. ISBN 9780738541648.
