= 1999 Sandwell Metropolitan Borough Council election =

1999 UK local government election

The 1999 Sandwell Metropolitan Borough Council election took place on 6 May 1999 to elect members of Sandwell Metropolitan Borough Council in the West Midlands, England. One third of the council was up for election and the Labour Party stayed in overall control of the council.

After the election, the composition of the council was:

- Labour 61
- Liberal Democrat 9
- Conservative 2

== Campaign ==
Before the election Labour held 60 of the 72 seats on the council, with the Liberal Democrats the main opposition on the council. Labour were defending 19 seats, the Liberal Democrats 3 and the Conservatives 1 seat. The Conservative seat being defended in Wednesbury North was one of only 2 the party held, but both the Conservatives and Liberal Democrats planned to contest all 24 seats. The other seat being contested was in Tipton Green, where an independent Labour councillor stood down at the election. Candidates in the election included 2 from the British National Party and 1 from the National Front, meanwhile the Liberal Democrat candidate in Friar Park ward withdrew from the election.

During the election the Conservatives had an error on one of their leaflets with the phone number being for a Labour supporter.

== Election result ==
The results saw Labour increase their majority on the council after gaining 1 seat to hold 61 of the 72 seats. Labour made the only gain in Tipton Green with the successful Labour candidate, Syeda Khatun, becoming the first Muslim woman to win a seat on Sandwell council. Tipton Green also saw the British National Party win 17.2% of the vote, the best result for the party in the West Midlands area. The Liberal Democrats held the 3 seats they had been defending to keep 9 councillors, with Victoria Handy becoming the youngest councillor at the age of 21 after holding Charlemont for the party. Meanwhile, the Conservatives held Wednesbury North, but failed to make any gains, to stay on just 2 seats. Overall turnout in the election was 23.6%, with Princes End ward seeing one of the lowest turnouts in the country.

Sandwell local election result 1999
Party	Seats	Gains	Losses	Net gain/loss	Seats %	Votes %	Votes	+/−
Labour	20	1	0	+1	83.3	54.9	28,383	-0.2
Liberal Democrats	3	0	0	0	12.5	15.7	8,124	-0.3
Conservative	1	0	0	0	4.2	25.2	13,024	+0.9
Independent	0	0	1	-1	0.0	2.5	1,277	
BNP	0	0	0	0	0.0	1.4	714	
Socialist Alternative	0	0	0	0	0.0	0.3	145	
National Front	0	0	0	0	0.0	0.1	75	

== Ward results ==
Abbey
Party	Candidate	Votes	%	±%
Labour	Robert Piper	1,687	59.6	
Conservative	Karen Bissell	832	29.4	
Liberal Democrats	Roger Prior	310	11.0	
Majority		855	30.2	
Turnout		2,829	31.8	
Labour hold		Swing		

Blackheath
Party	Candidate	Votes	%	±%
Labour	Robert Price	1,220	65.8	
Conservative	David Dixon	421	22.7	
Liberal Democrats	Walter Bowdler	212	11.4	
Majority		799	43.1	
Turnout		1,853	20.1	
Labour hold		Swing		

Bristnall
Party	Candidate	Votes	%	±%
Labour	Richard Young	1,398	61.6	
Conservative	Ewart Johnson	649	28.6	
Liberal Democrats	Brian Rogers	223	9.8	
Majority		749	33.0	
Turnout		2,270	23.8	
Labour hold		Swing		

Charlemont
Party	Candidate	Votes	%	±%
Liberal Democrats	Victoria Handy	1,054	41.2	
Labour	Jacqueline Harper	811	31.7	
Conservative	Norman Lawley	695	27.1	
Majority		243	9.5	
Turnout		2,560	27.7	
Liberal Democrats hold		Swing		

Cradley Heath and Old Hill
Party	Candidate	Votes	%	±%
Labour	John Southall	1,357	66.8	
Conservative	David Burgess	463	22.8	
Liberal Democrats	Malcolm Wilson	212	10.4	
Majority		894	44.0	
Turnout		2,032	22.3	
Labour hold		Swing		

Friar Park
Party	Candidate	Votes	%	±%
Labour	Geoffrey Lewis	1,049	68.8	
Conservative	Geoffrey Smith	475	31.2	
Majority		574	37.7	
Turnout		1,524	18.3	
Labour hold		Swing		

Great Barr
Party	Candidate	Votes	%	±%
Liberal Democrats	Robert White	1,377	49.7	
Labour	Jean Heywood	753	27.2	
Conservative	Robert Lawrence	641	23.1	
Majority		624	22.5	
Turnout		2,771	28.2	
Liberal Democrats hold		Swing		

Great Bridge
Party	Candidate	Votes	%	±%
Labour	Jean Marson	965	59.8	
Conservative	Philip Mansell	325	20.1	
BNP	Sharron Edwards	209	12.9	
Liberal Democrats	Brian Burkitt	116	7.2	
Majority		640	39.6	
Turnout		1,615	16.8	
Labour hold		Swing		

Greets Green and Lyng
Party	Candidate	Votes	%	±%
Labour	Robert Badham	1,351	75.9	
Conservative	Thomas Hackett	283	15.9	
Liberal Democrats	Philip Roberts	147	8.3	
Majority		1,068	60.0	
Turnout		1,781	21.8	
Labour hold		Swing		

Hateley Heath
Party	Candidate	Votes	%	±%
Labour	William Edis	875	54.2	
Liberal Democrats	Rachel Cheeseman	491	30.4	
Conservative	Margaret Smith	247	15.3	
Majority		384	23.8	
Turnout		1,613	17.5	
Labour hold		Swing		

Langley
Party	Candidate	Votes	%	±%
Labour	Martin Prestidge	1,449	60.5	
Conservative	Roland Hill	671	28.0	
Liberal Democrats	Julia Garrett	276	11.5	
Majority		778	32.5	
Turnout		2,396	24.7	
Labour hold		Swing		

Newton
Party	Candidate	Votes	%	±%
Liberal Democrats	Joyce Underhill	1,410	53.4	
Labour	Thomas Slater	811	30.7	
Conservative	Peter Leavesley	420	15.9	
Majority		599	22.7	
Turnout		2,641	28.8	
Liberal Democrats hold		Swing		

Old Warley
Party	Candidate	Votes	%	±%
Labour	Brian Caddick	1,217	46.7	
Conservative	William Shipman	1,125	43.2	
Liberal Democrats	Gaynor Skeldon	263	10.1	
Majority		92	3.5	
Turnout		2,605	29.8	
Labour hold		Swing		

Oldbury
Party	Candidate	Votes	%	±%
Labour	Mahbbob Hussain	1,911	69.4	
Liberal Democrats	Anthony Wilkinson	450	16.3	
Conservative	William Aitken	393	14.3	
Majority		1,461	53.1	
Turnout		2,754	33.1	
Labour hold		Swing		

Princes End
Party	Candidate	Votes	%	±%
Labour	Christopher Couzens	589	49.3	
Conservative	Raymond Nock	246	20.6	
Independent Tipton Labour	June Newell	219	18.3	
National Front	John Lord	75	6.3	
Liberal Democrats	Samantha Ford	65	5.4	
Majority		343	28.7	
Turnout		1,194	12.2	
Labour hold		Swing		

Rowley
Party	Candidate	Votes	%	±%
Labour	Adrian Bailey	1,302	66.7	
Conservative	Fredric Powles	267	13.7	
Independent	Fred Hadley	251	12.9	
Liberal Democrats	Stephen Cole	133	6.8	
Majority		1,035	53.0	
Turnout		1,953	20.3	
Labour hold		Swing		

Smethwick
Party	Candidate	Votes	%	±%
Labour	Keith Davies	1,483	71.4	
Conservative	Nicholas Meacham	389	18.7	
Liberal Democrats	Miriam Banting	206	9.9	
Majority		1,094	52.6	
Turnout		2,078	24.3	
Labour hold		Swing		

Soho and Victoria
Party	Candidate	Votes	%	±%
Labour	Darren Cooper	1,020	73.3	
Conservative	Jeanette Hill	279	20.1	
Liberal Democrats	Sara Richards	92	6.6	
Majority		741	53.3	
Turnout		1,391	26.2	
Labour hold		Swing		

St Paul's
Party	Candidate	Votes	%	±%
Labour	Bawa Dhallu	1,286	51.9	
Doctor Practising at Lewisham Road Surgery	Kazi Rahman	807	32.6	
Conservative	David Read	283	11.4	
Liberal Democrats	Charles Simms	101	4.1	
Majority		479	19.3	
Turnout		2,477	30.5	
Labour hold		Swing		

Tipton Green
Party	Candidate	Votes	%	±%
Labour	Syeda Khatun	1,303	44.3	
Conservative	Alison Jones	833	28.3	
BNP	Stephen Edwards	505	17.2	
Liberal Democrats	Anthony Underhill	156	5.3	
Socialist Alternative	Ian Barton	145	4.9	
Majority		470	16.0	
Turnout		2,942	24.9	
Labour gain from Independent		Swing		

Tividale
Party	Candidate	Votes	%	±%
Labour	Brian James	986	57.2	
Conservative	Steven Hockley	433	25.1	
Liberal Democrats	Roger Bradley	304	17.6	
Majority		553	32.1	
Turnout		1,723	18.2	
Labour hold		Swing		

Wednesbury North
Party	Candidate	Votes	%	±%
Conservative	Raymond Partridge	1,378	60.0	
Labour	Elaine Giles	839	36.6	
Liberal Democrats	Mark Handy	78	3.4	
Majority		539	23.5	
Turnout		2,295	26.0	
Conservative hold		Swing		

Wednesbury South
Party	Candidate	Votes	%	±%
Labour	George Turton	1,162	56.3	
Conservative	Margaret Dixon	762	36.9	
Liberal Democrats	Samantha Campbell	141	6.8	
Majority		400	19.4	
Turnout		2,065	22.3	
Labour hold		Swing		

West Bromwich Central
Party	Candidate	Votes	%	±%
Labour	Mohinder Tagger	1,559	65.5	
Conservative	Anne Hughes	514	21.6	
Liberal Democrats	Sheila Rogers	307	12.9	
Majority		1,045	43.9	
Turnout		2,380	28.3	
Labour hold		Swing		
