= Alisha Thomas Morgan =

American politician

Alisha Searcy

Member of the Georgia House of Representatives from the 39th district
- In office January 2003 – January 2015
- Succeeded by: Erica Thomas

Personal details
- Born: September 5, 1978 (age 47) Miami, Florida, U.S.
- Party: Democratic
- Education: Spelman College (BA); Kennesaw State University (MEd)

Alisha Thomas Morgan or Alisha Thomas Searcy (born September 5, 1978) is an American politician. She was a member of the Georgia House of Representatives from 2003 to 2015, representing the 39th district.

== Personal life and education ==
Morgan graduated from Spelman College, where she majored in sociology and drama.

== Career ==
Morgan was elected to the Georgia House of Representatives at the age of 23. She served on the Appropriations Committee, Education Committee, Governmental Affairs Committee, Health & Human Services Committee, and Juvenile Justice Committee.

Morgan is a strong supporter of charter schools and supports changing the Georgia Constitution to create a state commission to review charter school applications denied by the school board. She also supports a "trigger option" that would allow local parents to remove the administration of failing schools. Morgan supported Section 5 of the Voting Rights Act as a way to protect minorities from being stripped of their voting rights; this section was struck down by the Supreme Court in Shelby County v. Holder. Morgan also opposes Stand-your-ground laws.

In 2009, Morgan started her own company, Morganics, which focuses on public speaking and leadership development. Morgan has also published a book, titled "No Apologies: Powerful Lessons in Life, Love & Politics."

In 2014, Morgan and her opponent, Valarie Wilson, went against one another in the Democratic runoff for State School Superintendent. Later, Wilson won the Democratic runoff facing Republican Richard Woods.

Party political offices
Preceded by Otha E. Thornton Jr.	Democratic nominee for Georgia Superintendent of Schools; 2022	Succeeded by Lydia Powell
