= Community youth workers =

Community youth workers are young people and adults who are engaged in education, empowerment, activism, or other activities focused on adolescents in community-based settings, including churches, schools, or community centers. As a distinct field, community youth work, (often just called youth work), has been established in the United States since the early 20th century. Youth organizations including the YMCA, Boy Scouts, and 4-H set the early standard for youth work. Many believe they were simply following the principles of organizations in the United Kingdom. Since that time a plethora of groups have become active, leading advocacy, research, and education about community youth work around the world.

== See also ==
- Community youth development
- Positive youth development
- Youth voice
- Civic engagement
- Volunteerism
- Youth work
- Youth leaders
