= Syeda Khatun =

British Labour Party politician, councillor (born 1969)

Cllr Syeda Khatun MBE
- সৈয়দা খানা খাতুন

Sandwell Metropolitan Borough Councillor for Tipton Green ward
- Incumbent
- Assumed office 6 May 1999

Personal details
- Born: Syeda Amina Khatun; 10 January 1969 (age 57) East Pakistan (now Bangladesh)
- Party: Labour
- Relations: Munir Ali (brother)
- Children: 4
- Occupation: Youth worker
- Profession: Politician
- Website: Syeda Khatun

Syeda Amina Khatun, MBE (Bengali: সৈয়দা খানা খাতুন; born 10 January 1969) is a British Labour Party politician, councillor for Tipton Green in the Sandwell Metropolitan Borough Council and Cabinet Advisor for Education. In 1999, she was the first Bangladeshi woman to be elected in the Midlands region.

== Early life ==
Khatun was born in East Pakistan (now Bangladesh) and moved to England with her parents in October 1975.

== Career ==
In 1986, Khatun started her first job as research/outreach worker for the Department for Education and later became a language support tutor.

Since the mid-1980s, Khatun has managed various voluntary organisations. She has particularly helped manage and start up women groups in the Midlands such as the Bangladeshi Women's Association and the Youth Group for Local Young Women as well as mother and toddler groups. She has also engaged in setting up numerous young peoples' groups and even ones for the elderly too. She is also a campaigner for environmental improvements.

Since 1995, Khatun has been employed as a youth worker as well as project managing a local advocacy group called the "Asha Project". She is also the non-executive director of Rowley Regis and Tipton Primary Care Trust. Within the Sandwell Metropolitan Council, she is a Cabinet Advisor for Education together with being the alternative member of committee for Europe. She is also serving as chair for Tipton Town Committee. She is the vice-chair of the scrutiny management board and chair of the neighbourhood scrutiny panel for the municipal year 2011–2012.

In May 1999, in the Sandwell Metropolitan Borough Council election, Khatun was elected as councillor for Tipton Green, becoming the first Bangladeshi woman to be elected in the Midlands region and the first Muslim woman to win a seat in Sandwell Metropolitan Borough Council.

== Awards and recognition ==
In 2004, Khatun was appointed a Member of the Order of the British Empire (MBE) in the 2004 New Year Honours for her services to community development in Sandwell. In February 2008, she received an award for her services to the community by the Birmingham Bangladeshi League.

== Personal life ==
Khatun is a Muslim. At the age of 15, she had an arranged marriage and has two sons and two daughters (born between 1985 and 1995).

== See also ==
- British Bangladeshi
- List of British Bangladeshis
- List of ethnic minority politicians in the United Kingdom
