= Youth work =

Community support activity

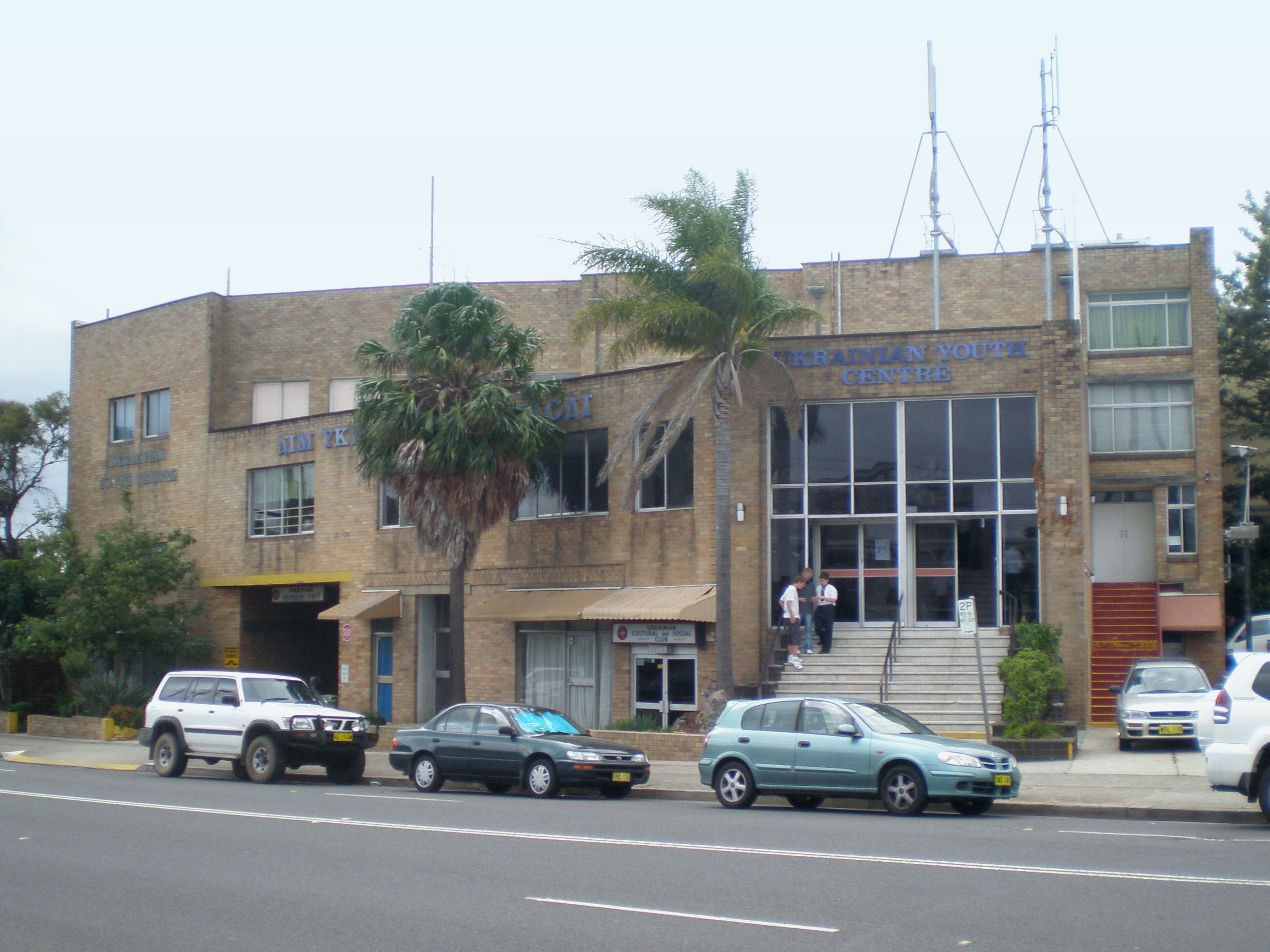
A Ukrainian community youth centre in Lidcombe, New South Wales, Australia

Youth work is a community support activity aimed at older children and adolescents. Depending upon the culture and the community, different services and institutions may exist for this purpose. In general, it provides an environment where young people can engage in informal educational activities. Throughout the United Kingdom, United States, and Canada, youth work aims "to facilitate personal, educational, and social development". Through participative activities and coordinated programs, it seeks to enable young people in "gaining a voice, influence, and place in society in a period of their transition from dependence to independence". By nature and design these activities would be inclusive, educative, and empowering, and based on partnership, equality of opportunity, and respecting diversity.

== Overview ==
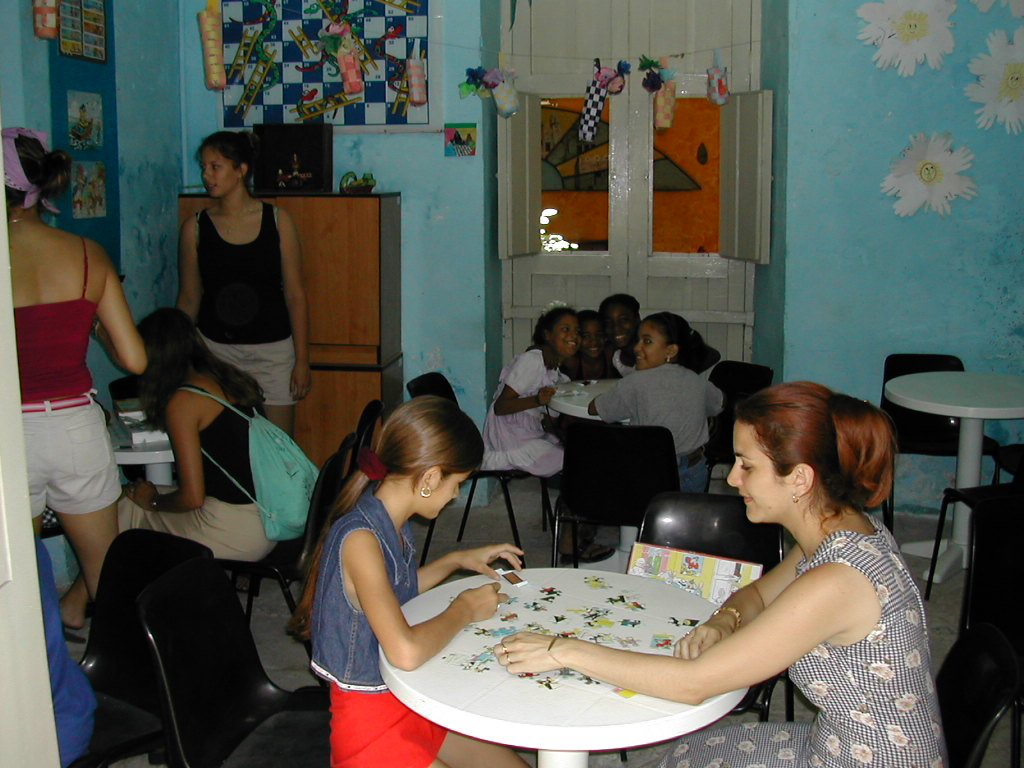
A combination daycare and youth center in Havana, Cuba, where children can hear stories, play games, create art, and so on

"Youth work" is defined as activities that intentionally seek to impact young people. This is primarily a set of loosely affiliated activities that have been defined, redefined, examined, and reinvented in subsequent generations.

In Ireland the Youth Work Act of 2001 states that,

"Youth work" means a planned programme of education designed for the purpose of aiding and enhancing the personal and social development of young persons through their voluntary participation, and which (a) complements their formal, academic, or vocational education and training; and (b) is provided primarily by voluntary youth work organisations.

However, critics of this particular definition report need for expansion of the limited view, "Youth work should aim to engage with society and bring about social change in an unequal society."

Some critics report that youth work should seek youth participation in justice, equality, and youth empowerment through political engagement. They say youth should be liberated with orientation in critical analysis of local and global influences (globalization) in their lives and in their communities. Others like Julius Nyerere say education, the educative aspect of youth work should be a voluntary pursuit of the youth for it to be a tool of personal and social liberation.

Youth work is historically said to focus on five areas, including a focus on young people; an emphasis on voluntary participation and relationship; a commitment to association by youth and adults; friendly and informal atmospheres, and; acting with integrity.

== Functions ==
Merton, et al. in 2004 through a research report delineated the following as primary functions of youth work.

- Integrative: It is concerned with socialization of youth and introducing them to norms and expectations of society for directing them to social fitness, this has a preparation to adult world function.
- Reflexive: It is concerned with ensuring inclusion of youth perspectives in social institutions, this has an anti-oppressive function.
- Redistributive: It is concerned with ensuring social justice to youth and developing social capital for youth empowerment.

== History ==
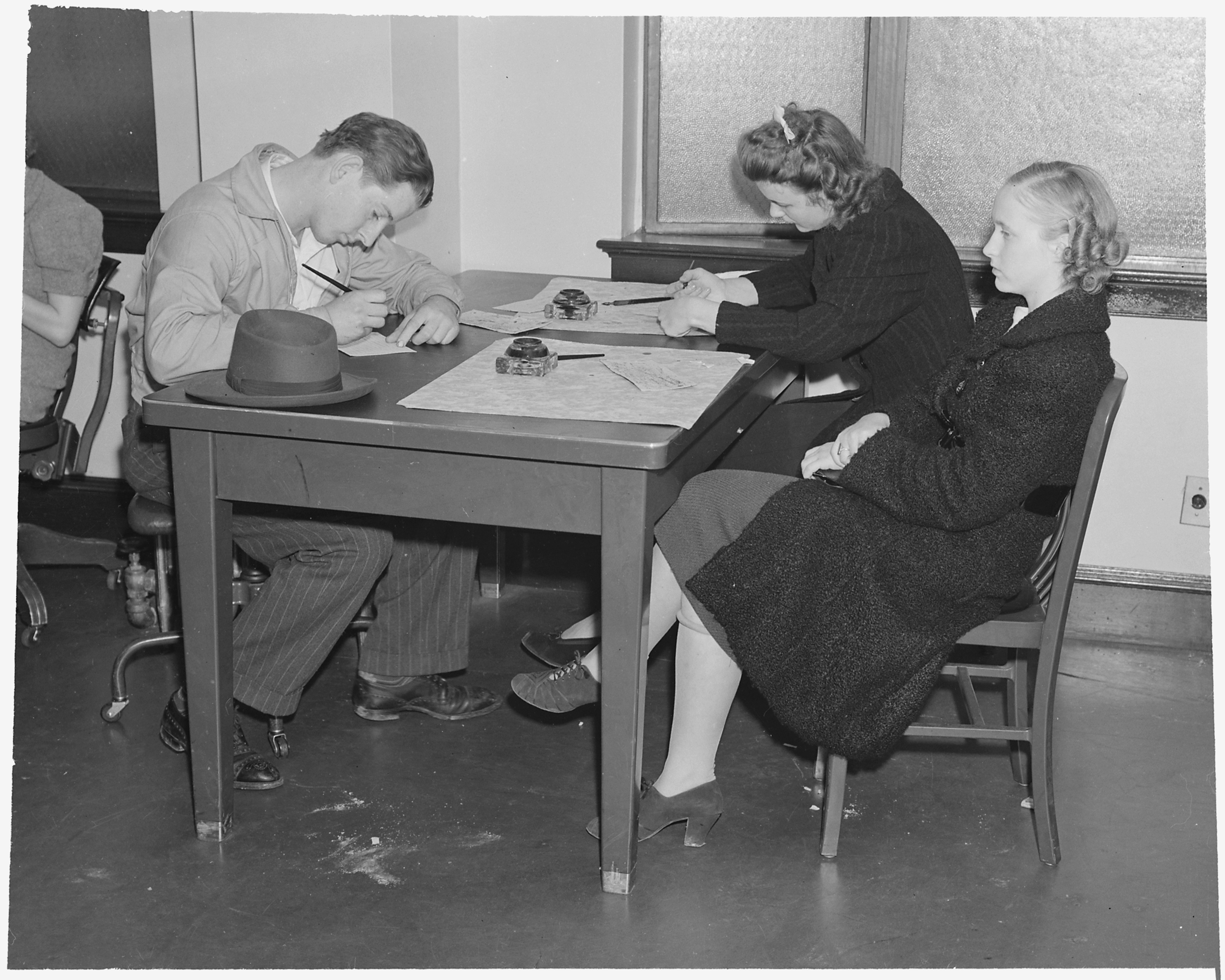
Young clients of a Junior Employment Service created to help youth without any work experience. Oakland, California, 1940.

Youth work often emphasises the need to involve young people in the running of their own services through a process of youth-led youth work. Historically there are a number of different motives for the development of youth work in the UK. First, early youth workers, often from the middle classes, frequently saw working with deserving young people as an expression of their Christian faith. Secondly there was a concern to instill a middle class set of values in working class youth.

This early approach to youth work has actually been around since the birth of the Industrial Revolution in the 19th century, which was the first time that young men left their own homes and cottage industries to migrate to the big towns. The result of this migration was an emergent youth culture in urban areas, which locally was responded to by the efforts of local people. Although with the formation of the YMCA (and later Scouting) organisations were founded whose sole aim was to address these issues, the emphasis was always on providing for young people.

A government review of the Youth Service, set up in November 1958 and chaired by Lady Albemarle, was published in 1960. It argued cogently for specific kinds of provision to be provided by local councils and ushered in a significant building boom of new premises for youth work. Often thought of as a golden age, the period following the Albemarle report was a time of thriving centre-based youth work.

Today (as outlined in the Transforming Youth Work document released in 1998 by the DfES) it is the statutory duty of all local government organisations to provide a youth service in their region. Also for the first time the youth service has national targets that have to be met with regard to the reach (initial contact) with young people, the number of relationships developed with young people and the number of accredited learning programmes achieved through the youth service.

In 1999 in the UK the main national professional organisations and trades union (CYWU) agreed to join other professional bodies representing informal education practitioners (community workers, community based adult educators, community educators), to create a UK wide National Training Organisation called PAULO (named in honour of the educator Paulo Freire. PAULO was formally approved by the Government to set the occupational training standards for all people working in this employment sector. In 2002 PAULO formed part of the Lifelong Learning UK Sector Skills Council.

== Approaches ==
=== Community youth work ===
Community youth workers provide community-based activities for young people in a variety of settings throughout local communities, including places of worship, nonprofit organizations and government agencies.

=== Youth empowerment ===
Youth empowerment is the deliberate granting of authority to young people by adults. This may take the form of youth leadership in program or organizational planning, research, design, facilitation or evaluation. This youth-centered approach has been shown to be particularly effective at promoting and sustaining youth engagement and for its efficacy across cultural, social and other boundaries.

Schemes associated with youth empowerment include programs various types of youth participation throughout organizations, governments and schools. This includes involving youth as planners, researchers, teachers, evaluators, decision-makers and advocates.

=== Centre-based youth work ===
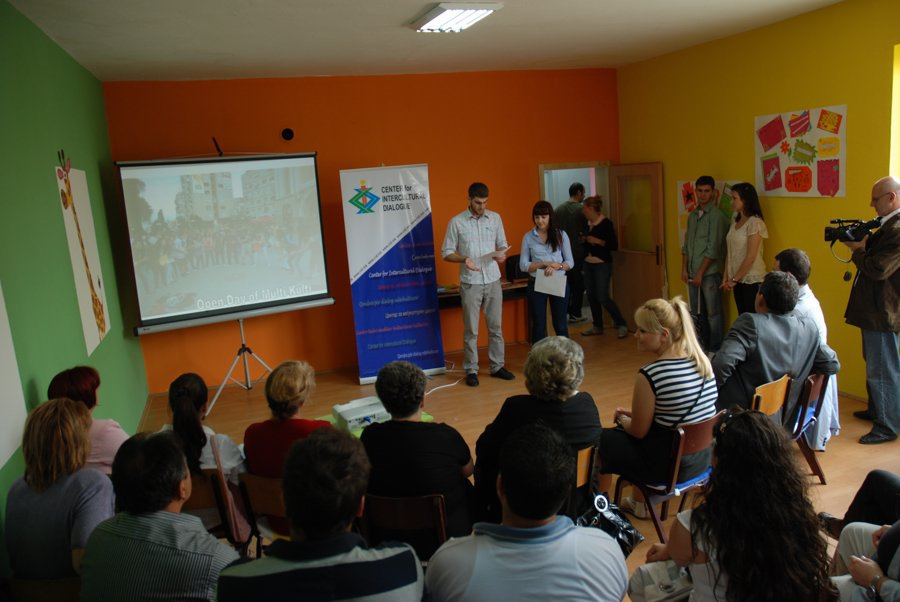
The Center for Intercultural Dialogue manages several youth centers in Kumanovo, North Macedonia, aiming to offer youth work and to bridge the community divide in the region.

This youth work is carried out at a dedicated premises, which may include facilities such as drop-in coffee bars, sports facilities and advice centres. Most youth clubs fall under this fairly wide category. It is reliant on young people choosing to come to the centre, but in some cases may be linked with outreach or school-based youth work.

=== Faith-based youth work ===
Faith-based youth work is carried out from a foundation of religious values and may be undertaken for the purpose of sharing or engendering religious views. In the Christian churches, the main purpose of faith-based youth work may be derived from the biblical commandment to "love your neighbour". In many faith-based situations the main agenda or purpose of youth work is aligned with the spiritual goals of the religion, or the perceived progress of a young person toward these goals.

The Catholic church sees young people themselves as capable of working with other young people to secure these aims, as well as calling on adults to engage with youth.

In Northern Ireland, 64% of youth work is faith-based.

=== Detached youth work ===
In its purest form, detached youth work is a form of street-based youth work provision that operates without the use of a centre and takes place where young people "are at" both geographically and developmentally. It is often confused with outreach work because of the similar principles, i.e. making contact on the streets with those "hard to reach" or "unattached" young people. Detached work is seen as more than trying to encourage young people to utilise existing provision (which is the often used definition of Outreach work) and is used as a method of delivering informal and social education and is concerned with addressing whatever needs are presented to or perceived by the youth worker.

Also referred to as "street work" by some European, North and South American practitioners, modern detached work appears to have been influenced in Great Britain and Ireland by early contributions from the United States, and in particular, accounts of the work carried out by the Welfare Council of New York with street gangs in the 1950s became some of the earliest literature available on the subject of street-based work. Street work has, however, always, since its earliest incarnations, had a role to play in youth work.

However, contributors on the subject, such as those referenced above, e.g. (Kaufman, 2001) & (Smith, 1996.) have discussed the ambiguity surrounding the titling of such forms of work and the regular confusion around which form of work is which and indeed as Smith himself states:

"There has been a good deal of dispute over how to label the work described here. The problem with notions such as 'detached' is that it could still be seen as making the youth centre or traditional youth organization the basic reference point. (These are what the workers are detached from). Furthermore, the titling adds to the stereotypical view of detached workers as 'mavericks' who float free of attachment. The reality of practice is that a central feature of the work is the process of becoming attached - to a neighbourhood, groups of young people, local community members and so on. To this can be added the pretty pointless debate between 'detached' and 'outreach' work. The latter, it is sometimes said, is mainly concerned with bringing people into existing organizations and activities; the former is about 'working with people where they are at'. In reality most 'detached' workers have to use existing organizations, and have a range of activities that people can plug into. Some care is needed around this area...Most detached workers have some sort of office and base (with group rooms etc.) Furthermore their contact making may well be 'off the street' in schools, various commercial leisure environments, and in people's homes".

Reproduced from the encyclopaedia of informal education http://www.infed.org

Adding to this debate is the fact that while there exists much support for street-based provision there is few definitions in existence to clearly distinguish the differences (if any) between 'Outreach' and 'Detached' work. That said, the Scottish Executive in 1998 commissioned The Princes Trust to carry out a National Development Project to develop Best Practice guidelines and methods to monitor, evaluate and create a National focus for Outreach and Detached Youth Work. Through their research they offered this clear and simple definition for detached work, that is adequate for all those who are unfamiliar with this type of youth work provision,

"Detached youth work is a model of youth work practice, targeted at vulnerable young people, which takes place on young people's own territory such as streets, cafes, parks and pubs at times that are appropriate to them and on their terms. It begins from where young people are in terms of their values, attitudes, issues and ambitions and is concerned with their personal and social development. It is characterised by purposeful interaction between youth workers and young people and utilises a range of youth and community work methods".

=== Outreach youth work ===
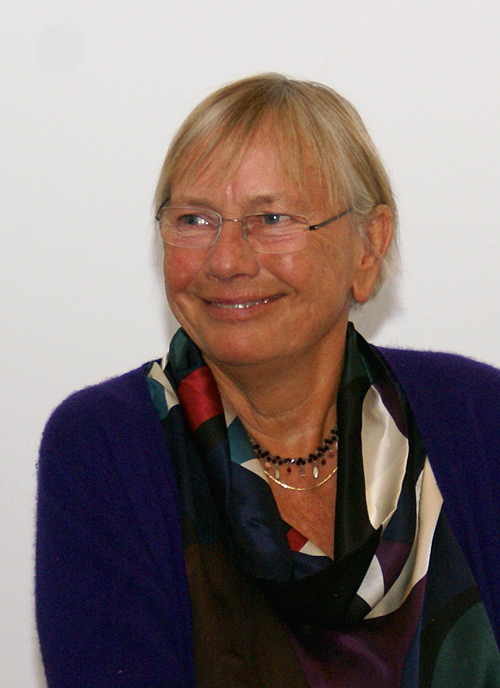
Tine Bryld, Danish social worker, writer and host of the social issues radio program Tværs for teenagers and youngsters

Similar to detached youth work, outreach is a form of youth work that takes place on young people's own territory and is a method of work that supports and compliments new and existing centre/project based youth work. Primarily used to inform young people of services that exist in their locality and to encourage them to use such services, Outreach can also seek to identify, through consultation with young people, any gaps that exist in services aimed at meeting their needs.As opposed to Detached Youth Work, Outreach is seen as an extension to centre-based work , Outreach work takes place when workers who are usually centre based go onto the streets with an agenda of their own to pursue, usually to encourage young people to attend their club.

As highlighted above there are few definitions available to clearly distinguish the differences between Outreach and Detached work and according to The Princes Trust's research for the Scottish Executive, the reason for this may be partly due to the similarities in the places where the work is carried out (on the streets, in parks and cafes) and the fact that both models work with the same target groups of young people (those who are disaffected or alienated). Furthermore, the research points out that "There is even some evidence from fieldwork that there can be an occasional overlap in practice between the two modes of work. For these and other reasons, definitions have received less emphasis in the literature than the principles and intentions of each of these modes of work".

=== School-based work ===
This form of youth work is carried out in schools and is provided directly for the pupils, often by an organisation external from the school. It may include lessons, assemblies, after-school clubs, one to one mentoring etc. There may be a link with other non-school youth activities.

=== Youth development ===
Youth development programs seek to identify the needs of young people from a social/educational perspective, and to meet those needs through structured, intentional activities that satisfy those needs. This area includes community youth development and positive youth development activities.

== Youth worker ==
Youth workers facilitate the personal, social and educational development of young people through informal education, care (e.g. preventive) or leisure approaches. All types of educative approaches are not ethical for youth work, examples for unethical forms of education are indoctrinating, inculcating, and brainwashing. Youth workers can work in many contexts and according to the roles they are known as enablers, facilitators, emancipators, animators or could be known by the set of activities they use to reach out to youth. The validity of youth work approaches are based on whether they are educational, participative, empowering, promotes equality of opportunities, etc. The basic principles of youth work are respecting young people, providing accessible and value oriented opportunities (genuinely useful) for voluntary participation, accountability, being anti-oppressive (e.g. social model of disability, unconscious bias training) in processes, confidentiality, reliability, trustworthiness, and being ethical in keeping boundaries.

In the UK and elsewhere, the main distinction is usually made between statutory, those who work as part of a government run initiative, and non-statutory, those that work in any other context. In some circumstances, the term should be carefully distinguished from Child and Youth Worker which refers to therapeutic work in the US and Canada.

Youth worker includes the orientation of young people to the adult world through socialisation, dismantling exclusion, and connecting them with resources needed for growth and development. Hence youth workers would hold different roles and use different set of skills and resources to attain youth work objectives. Different types of youth work is facilitated through centre-based work, detached work, school-based work, religion based work, etc.

=== Tasks and duties of direct youth work practice ===
Engaging youth in participation and aiding youth in locating self is an important aspect of youth work practice. A youth worker needs to identify an "opening" for practice and be willing to make that opening into an "opportunity" by find resources to meet the needs of the work through various stakeholders. When the needs are met an "obligation" should be made to delivering the services and enabling participation of youth at a specific level, this obligation then becomes a part of the macro-system of services. Through participation the youth should be able to locate themselves, their strengths and limitations. Through participation the youth would be able to learn the skills, knowledge, attitudes, and values that they have through the relational experience and reflective observation, this leads them to further their growth opportunities.

Main tasks and duties of direct youth work practice are:

- Establish contact and build relationships.
- Bring contacted youths together in groups/ open events and shared activities.
- Enable participation of youth in activity planning (e.g. sports, arts, outdoors, etc.), project developing (community, educational, etc.), evaluation and review of activities.
- Address, advocate, and educate about youth issues, influences, and interests.
- Provide guidance (in locating self and growth opportunities), instruction (teaching and directing), personal and social education, mentoring and support.
- Collaborative development of community resources, facilities, and services.
- Manage and develop community programs and resources of an organization.

== See also ==
- Youth leaders
- Community youth workers
- Kolb's experiential learning
- List of youth empowerment organizations
- One World Youth Project
- International Youth Change Maker
- Positive youth development
