= Youth leaders =

Youth leaders are youth work professionals or experienced volunteers leading non-formal educational and recreational activities. They take responsibility for a youth group and/or youth work activities, facilitating the activity and learning process, and supporting the young people's development.

A youth leader is not the same as a Child and Youth Worker in Canada and the United States of America, which is a role often centred on therapeutic intervention, residential care, or social services for at-risk youth.

== Training ==
In several countries they take special training in order to be employed.

For instance for non-professional Youth Leaders:

- In UK, National Vocational Qualification or Vocationally Related Qualification, Level 2 or 3 can be required (it replaced the RAMPs training).
- In other countries like Germany or France, specific certificates can be required by the employer ("JuLeiCa" in Germany and "BAFA" in France, higher are professional graduate programs).

For professional Youth Workers, professional qualification programmes of study are offered by universities or colleges of higher education.

== See also ==
Youth Workers, Community youth workers, Youth Work, Dr. Muhammad Saud
