= Terry Cummings (politician) =

American politician

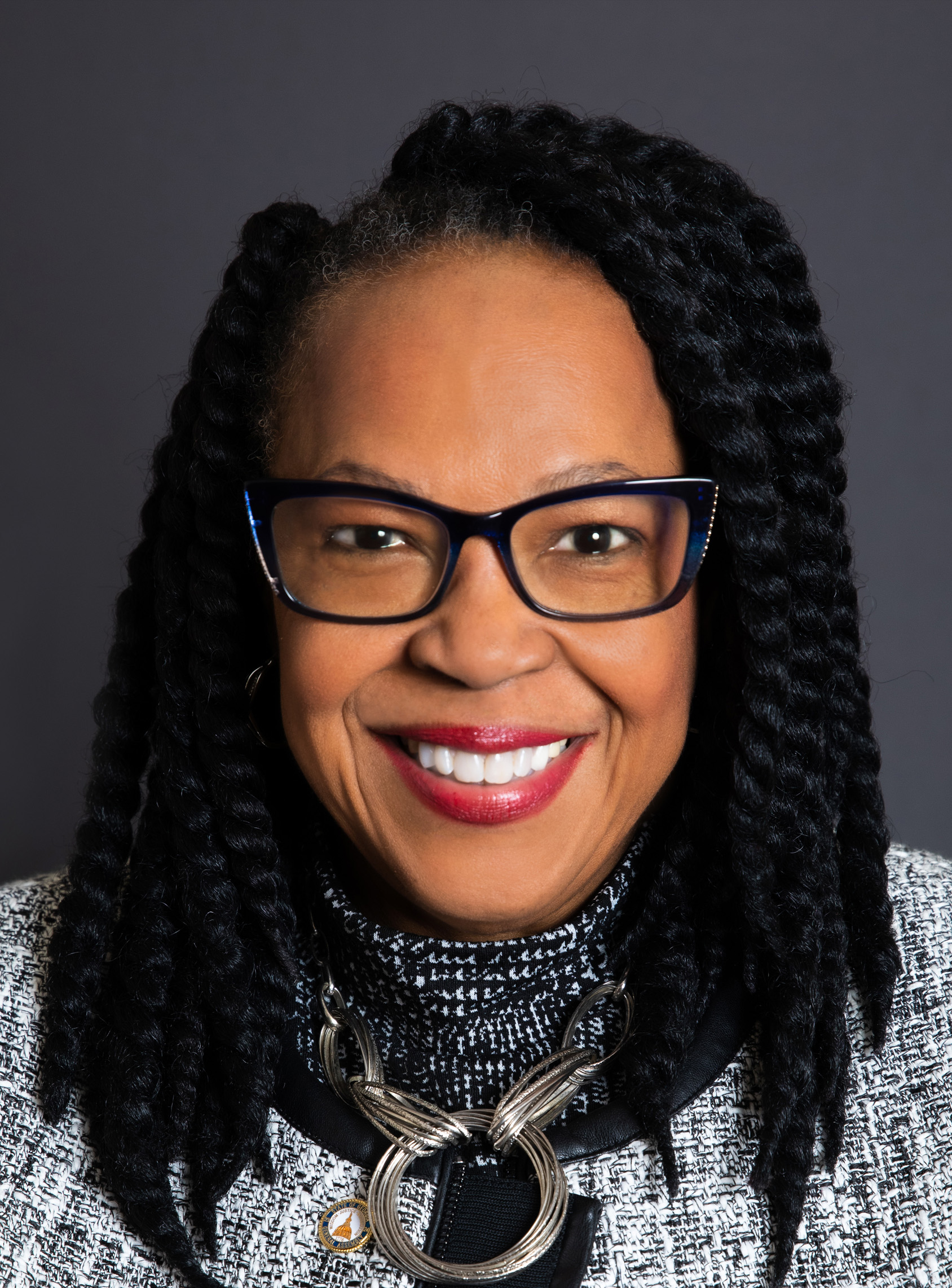
- Official portrait, 2025

Member of the Georgia House of Representatives from the 39th district
- Incumbent
- Assumed office January 9, 2023
- Preceded by: Erica Thomas (redistricting)

Personal details
- Born: Bronx, New York, U.S.
- Party: Democratic
- Education: Rutgers University; Georgetown University

Terry Alexis Cummings is an American politician from the Georgia Democratic Party who serves as a member of the Georgia House of Representatives representing District 39.
