= Informal education =

Education that can occur outside of a structured curriculum

Informal education is a general term for education that can occur outside traditional lectures or school-based learning systems. The term includes customized learning based on individual student interests within a regular classroom curriculum, but is not limited to that setting. It may occur through conversation, exploration, and the expansion of experience. Sometimes there is a clear link to a broader educational plan. The goal is to provide learners with tools that help them progress toward more complex material. It can refer to various forms of alternative education, such as unschooling or homeschooling, autodidacticism (self-teaching), and youth work.

Informal education can include both accidental and purposeful ways of acquiring new information. It can be discussion-based, and focuses on bridging the gaps between traditional classroom settings and life outside of the classroom.

== Role ==
People interpret information differently, and therefore a structured curriculum may not allow all learners to understand the information. Informal education is typically less structured than traditional classroom settings, which can make it an effective form of learning. Informal education can help individuals learn to react to and control different situations and settings. In addition, it combines social entities that are important for learning. Informal education may be viewed as the learning that comes as a part of being involved in youth and community organizations. This type of education often occurs as a spontaneous learning process. It helps to cultivate communities, associations and relationships that make for a positive learning environment.

== Characteristics ==
Some characteristics of informal education are:

- Informal education looks to create or deepen situations where people can learn, explore and enlarge experiences, and make changes.
- Provides an environment where everyone can learn together and can scaffold off of one another.
- Understanding that the activity can be based on any form of learning, the teaching does not have to be deliberate, more so implied. Students are given the tools to do complex materials over time, rather than teaching the complex material and then giving the tools.
- Focuses on the social aspects of learning, and how important collaborative learning is.
- The tools given to students are tangible for the processes in which they will be applied.
- Bridges the gap between school and life.
- Allows students a choice in learning, and how to approach the material.
- Make learning accessible in everyday life and in the future.
- Informal education is driven by conversation and interacting with others.

== Benefits ==
- Responsiveness when interacting with the environment.
- Allows for free choice and changes in interests.
- Bridges gap between theory and practical

== In indigenous African communities ==
Informal education has been the practice of indigenous communities in Africa since these communities have been established. The tradition of African education has long been closely intertwined with the daily life of the African people with the idea that children "learnt what they lived". The philosophy of traditional African education suggests that one’s education cannot be separated from the everyday life and the "curriculum" is thus considered "a way of life" with the ultimate goal being to create a "complete individual, [and] a lifelong learner". The knowledge and practices that are important to the community are generally passed down through the sharing of memories and participation in cultural activities. Their education system serves as "the information base for the community, which facilitates communication and decision-making". Similar to other indigenous communities such as the Chillihuani in Peru, African education is created with goals in mind but is not limited to typical classroom settings; students continually participate in various learning activities as they grow in the community.

The culture within traditional African communities contain methods of learning. Through song and dance children learn more about their language as well as how to read and write. Oral traditions are used to teach children about history and morals as well as other forms of culture and practical skills for survival. In northern Tanzania and southern Kenya, the children of the Maasai pastoralists learn skills such as "where to find water and green shrubs that can be fed to young calves" in case of drought. Children are encouraged to show respect to their elders and through this, children learn how to show respect through their actions and words. A child can even learn the circumstances of their birth through their names. Onipede, a Yoruba name in Nigeria, suggests that the child was born soon after the death of a family member. Through their traditional science, children learn how to contribute to health and food production. everything that is a part of their life is used as a means to learn about themselves, their communities, and their culture.

== Advantages ==
If a person masters a skill by becoming deeply engaged in solving a problem, then giving students real world issues or opportunities to solve problems in their own lives and communities would significantly motivate and help them to master new concepts. Teaching students new scientific concepts by using cultural tools could eliminate the time spent trying to figure out whether concepts are useful or not. This approach may motivate learners and help them to master what is taught from the start. If we applied English and grammar lessons to effectively communicate with others in the community, students would be more inclined to effectively master these concepts since they would be using them for individual or group purposes. Finally, formal schooling, unlike an informal school setting, discourages students from learning and problem solving on their own.

Informal learning can open up a plethora of intellectual growth in those that seek to learn outside a standard academic setting. Pursuits can be influenced by a smaller class size to be the best that they can be, with instructors better able to see to the individual care of each of their students.

== See also ==
- Nonformal learning
- Formal learning
- Informal learning

== Bibliography ==
- Brown, J. S., Collins, A., & Duguid, P. (1989). Situated cognition and the culture of learning. 18(1), 32.
- Blyth, C. (2008). The Art of Conversation. London: John Murray.
- Callanan, M., Cervantes, C., & Loomis, M. (2011). Informal learning.2, 646. doi:10.1002
- Dewey, J. (1933). How We Think. New York: D. C. Heath.
- Kahane, R. (1997). The Origins of Postmodern Youth: Informal Youth Movements in a Comparative Perspective. Berlin: De Gruyter. doi:10.1515/9783110817188.
- Rogoff, B. (2003). The cultural nature of human development. NY: Oxford University Press.
- Sennett, R. (2012) Together. The rituals, pleasures and politics of cooperation. London: Allen Lane.
- Zeldin (1999). Conversation: How Talk Can Change Your Life. London: Harvill Press.
