= List of youth empowerment organizations =

This is a list of organizations that promote, advocate, or otherwise affiliate with youth empowerment. This is an incomplete list which can or may never satisfy any objective standard for completeness.

== A ==
- Adventures of the Mind
- American Youth Congress
- AIESEC
- Article 12

== B ==
- Black United Front of Nova Scotia
- British Youth Council
- Blooming Education

== C ==
- Catch21
- Children and Youth International
- Civil Society Leadership Institute
- Community High School (Ann Arbor, Michigan)

== D ==
- DECA

== E ==
- Elevate (organization)
- European Youth Parliament

== F ==
- Freechild Institute for Youth Engagement
- Funky Dragon

== G ==
- Girls, Inc.
- Global Youth Action Network
- Go Grrrls

== I ==
- International Coordination Meeting of Youth Organisations
- International Federation of Liberal Youth
- International Youth Rights

== J ==
- Junior Chamber International

== M ==
- Midstory
- Millennium Kids
- MEChA

== N ==
- National Youth Leadership Council
- National Youth Rights Association
- Northern Ireland Youth Forum
- Northumberland Youth Advisory Council
- Not Back to School Camp

== O ==
- Oaktree

== P ==
- Palestinian Youth Association for Leadership and Rights Activation
- Panafrican Youth Union
- Paulo Freire Freedom School
- Peacefire
- Poplar HARCA

== R ==
- Reality Check NY
- Rotaract

== S ==
- Sano Sansar Initiative
- SEALNet
- Scottish Youth Parliament
- Sierra Youth Coalition / Coalition Jeunesse Sierra
- Student Nonviolent Coordinating Committee
- Students for Sensible Drug Policy
- Students for a Democratic Society
- Sangguniang Kabataan

== T ==
- Tzivos Hashem
- Taking Children Seriously
- Ten Sing
- The Youth Cafe

== U ==
- UK Youth Parliament

== W ==
- World Organization of the Scout Movement
- WE Charity

== Y ==
- Young Men's Christian Association
- Young Muslim Advisory Group
- Young Religious Unitarian Universalists
- Young Yatri Organization
- Youth Activism Project
- Youth Liberation of Ann Arbor
- Youth on Board
- Youth Service America
- World YWCA

== See also ==
- List of youth organizations
- List of youth topics
- Youth-led media
