= Young Religious Unitarian Universalists =

Organization affiliated with the Unitarian Universalist Association

- The official YRUU logo, based upon the flaming chalice motif and featuring the YRUU initialism
- Abbreviation: YRUU
- Predecessor: Liberal Religious Youth
- Formation: 1981 and 1982
- Type: religious organization
- Purpose: Youth program, youth ministry
- Location(s): United States and Canada
- Affiliations: Unitarian Universalist Association; Canadian Unitarian Council

Young Religious Unitarian Universalists (YRUU) is a term used within the Unitarian Universalist Association (UUA) in the United States and formerly the Canadian Unitarian Council. YRUU was an organization at the continental level primarily run by youth, ranging in age from 14 to 20, with mentoring adult partners. The continental organization of YRUU ended in 2008, but the term is still used by certain active youth groups and conferences at the congregational and district levels.

The continental YRUU goals included youth empowerment, social activism and building leadership qualities. YRUU members often made their presence known in public demonstrations; for instance, in the June 23, 2006 protest in St. Louis, Missouri, against Victoria's Secret for allegedly printing its catalogues on paper from endangered North American forests.

In February 2008, UUA President William G. Sinkford, in a letter to the YRUU Steering Committee, announced there would be no further funding for continental level YRUU at the end of the fiscal year. "There is broad consensus that the current structure for continental youth ministry is not serving our faith well," wrote Sinkford. "It is true that continental YRUU, as we have known it, will be replaced at some point by a new structure that will serve us better." Two months later, the UUA Board of Trustees announced it would cease its funding for the continental level YRUU activities in June 2008 and refocus its North American youth ministry endeavors. The Youth Ministry Working Group (YMWG) was appointed and charged with recommending a strategic imagination and framework for Unitarian Universalist youth ministry. The YMWG concluded in 2009 and issued a final set of recommendations of concrete actions that could bring forth a vision of vibrant, congregationally-based youth ministry and truly multigenerational faith communities.

Beginning in 1982, continental YRUU published the newspaper Synapse, which appeared three times a year. In 2005, budget cuts forced the publication to be switched to two online issues that were compiled into a single print edition. In 2007, the UUA's Office of Youth Ministries halted publication, identifying a lack of submissions and staffing, and announced that Synapse would be replaced by a newsletter that would be published three times a year. Until 2019 the UUA's Office of Youth and Young Adult Ministries published a monthly e-newsletter and a blog, Blue Boat, which was open to submissions about topics of interest to and/or written by UU youth, young adults, or their adult allies.

== See also ==
- List of youth empowerment organizations
- List of youth organizations
- Youth empowerment
- Youth-adult partnership
