= Liberal Religious Youth =

Organization affiliated with the Unitarian Universalist Association

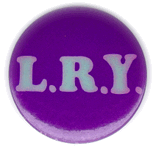
- Official LRY button, worn by LRYers since the 1960s.
- Abbreviation: LRY
- Predecessor: Young People's Religious Union (Unitarian; 1896); Young People's Christian Union (Universalist; 1898)
- Successor: Young Religious Unitarian Universalists
- Formation: 1954
- Dissolved: 1982
- Type: religious organization
- Headquarters: Boston, Massachusetts, United States
- Location(s): United States & Canada
- Affiliations: American Unitarian Association & Universalist Church of America (1954–1961), Unitarian Universalist Association (1961–1982)

Liberal Religious Youth (LRY) was an autonomous, North American youth organization affiliated with the Unitarian Universalist Association (UUA). LRY was unique as a church youth group in that it was governed solely by its members, who were generally between the ages of fourteen and nineteen years old, with adults serving only in an advisory capacity. Though partial funding and office space were provided by the UUA, primary funding was through an independent endowment, the investment of which was controlled by the LRY board of directors.

Continental LRY was run by an executive committee, usually consisting of four or five full-time officers, elected to one-year positions by the board of directors. Executive committee members shared an apartment and office in Boston and, like the board of directors, were all under the age of twenty. Throughout the 1960s and most of the 1970s, the LRY office was in the UU headquarters at 25 Beacon Street, Boston. In the late 1970s it was moved by the UUA to the basement of a smaller building behind the headquarters. The LRY Executive Committee wrote program materials for youth groups and kept in touch with their international membership via their newspaper, People Soup, which was also completely written, edited and published by the youth staff.

== History ==
Official LRY Logo, used in the early years of LRY.

LRY was founded in 1954, before the official consolidation of the American Unitarian Association and the Universalist Church of America in 1961, and has roots going back both to the Unitarian Young People's Religious Union, organized in 1896, and the Universalist Young People's Christian Union, founded in 1898.

In the 1950s, 1960s, and 1970s, LRYers were seriously involved in the counterculture, civil rights and anti-war movements. At times these radical activities were sanctioned by their elders in the church, but at other times they were condemned. In the 1980s, these activities continued but, along with the rest of the country, the leadership of the Unitarian Universalist Association (UUA) was becoming more conservative, and relations between the leaders of LRY and the UUA became progressively more strained.

Because of ongoing conflict with Unitarian Universalist adult leadership, and amid a great deal of controversy, LRY was disbanded in 1982. Within the Unitarian Universalist Association it was replaced in 1982 by a new youth program, Young Religious Unitarian Universalists(YRUU).

== Conferences and summer camps ==
Many Unitarian Universalist congregations had a local LRY chapter, which typically had at least one meeting per month, with some groups meeting weekly. The "locals" were organized into regional federations, such as BSF (Bay Shore [MA] Federation), LAF (Long Island [NY] Area Federation), CMF (Central Midwest Federation), the Iroquois Federation (upstate New York), LSD (Lower South District),(ECF) the Eastern Canada Federation, and Toak-TM (Texas, Oklahoma, Arkansas, Kansas, Tennessee, Missouri), the members of which elected officers to represent them on the continental board of directors. Many federations were also organized into intermediate "regional committees" such as MiCon (Mid-Continent Regional Committee), NERC (New England Regional Committee), MARC (Middle Atlantic Regional Council), etc. Regional committees, federations and local groups hosted weekend conferences at UU churches or campgrounds, at which the members of locals got to know their fellow LRYers from other locals, or from other regions entirely. Many LRYers would travel great distances for particular conferences, and hitchhiking was a popular mode of transportation. As many as 120 kids would gather at regional conferences, which were planned and entiredly carried off by people under 20. Near the end of LRY, there was also a growing population of LRYers who had no local group, and only attended conferences. This was largely because some UU churches refused to allow LRYers to have a local at their church anymore. Unitarian Universalist summer camps existed throughout the US and Canada, where campers often formed lifelong friendships, and many counselors were drawn from active LRY groups. These camps included Rowe in Massachusetts; Ferry Beach in Maine; Homestead, originally at a site near Carmel, New York and later in Harriman State Park, New York; Star Island, in the Isles of Shoals off the coast of New Hampshire and Maine; Unirondack, in the Adirondack Mountains; Unicamp, near Shelburne, Ontario; DeBenneville Pines, in the San Bernardino Mountains in California; The Mountain, in Highlands, North Carolina; and many others. Week-long summer conferences were held at many of these camps, and non-UU camps were sometimes rented for events such as OPIK in Tar Hollow State Forest, Ohio, the LRY Continental Conference (a.k.a. Con Con), the location of which rotated throughout the US, and Summer's End, which took place every Labor Day weekend in New England. Summer's End is now an autonomous conference that occurs annually in mid-August

== Notable LRYers ==
- Carolyn Garcia (a.k.a. Mountain Girl, a.k.a. Carolyn Adams) – Merry Prankster and the wife of Jerry Garcia of the Grateful Dead.
- David Helvarg – noted environmentalist.
- Ray Kurzweil – author.
- Joyce Maynard – author.
- Joshua Prager – A physician leader in the field of neuromodulation.
- Michael Ventura – author, screenwriter, critic, and founder of the LA Weekly.

Carla Rippey, visual artist and former director of "La Esmeralda," a Mexican arts university.

Ken Friedman, author, academic, and the youngest founding member of the art movement Fluxus.

John Oughton, author and academic.

== See also ==
- List of youth empowerment organizations
- Youth empowerment
