= Children and Youth International =

International non-governmental organization

- Founded: 2010; Brussels, Belgium
- Founder: Ben Vanpeperstraete, Ivana Savic, Michaela Hogenboom, Pieter-Jan Van De Velde, Felix Beck, Brendan Coolsaet, Sébastien Duyck.
- Type: Non-governmental organization
- Purpose: Youth empowerment, Post-2015 Development Agenda, Sustainable development, Disaster risk reduction,
- Location: Global, HQ: Brighton, UK
- Region served: Worldwide
- Method: Capacity-building, empowerment, fundraising
- Website: www.unmgcy.org/cyi/

Children and Youth International, formerly Rio+twenties, is a non-governmental youth-led and volunteer based youth empowerment organization based in Brussels, Belgium, New York, US, and Brighton, UK. Its goal is to "build capacity and empower young people and their representative structures to actively participate in the preparatory processes of the UN Conference on Sustainable Development (UNCSD) in Rio in 2012 (Rio+20)". It was founded by Ben Vanpeperstraete, Ivana Savic, Michaela Hogenboom, Pieter-Jan Van De Velde, Felix Beck, Brendan Coolsaet, Sébastien Duyck with the involvement and later leadership of Lloyd Russell-Moyle who later became a British member of parliament.

The organization has started to serve as the Organising Partner of the Major Group for Children and Youth during the United Nations Conference on Sustainable Development.

Within the international community working on sustainable development and the Rio+20 Conference, Rio+twenties is known for its capacity building initiatives focussing on youth, such as the "Rio+20 Participation Guide for Children and Youth" and the "Rio+20: an introduction for children and youth" animation movie. In cooperation with other youth organizations, the Participation Guide, originally in English, was translated into four other official UN languages, and made available through the organization's website.

== Board ==
The current board are:

- Mai Thin Yu Mon – Myanmar
- Bitania Lulu Berhanu (Chair Governance Committee) – Ethiopia
- Karol Alejandra Arambula Carrillo – Mexico
- Sharon Lo (Chair Grievance Committee) – UK
- Anna-Theresia Ekman – Sweden
- Zephanii Smith Eisenstat – USA
- Mary Kate Costello (chair) – USA
- Sajith Wijesuriya – Sri Lanka
- Carson Kiburo Kibett – Kenya
- Zoe Carletide – UK
- Regine Guevara (Treasurer) – Philippines
- Roman Chukov (Vice Chair) – Russia
- Bubacarr Singhateh (Secretary) – Gambia
- Yolanda Jacob – USA
- Rohit Pothukuchi – India
- Anja Olin Pape – Sweden
- Elisa Novoa – Colombia
- Alex Wang – China
- Sam Loni – Iran
- Luiza Drummond Veado – US
- Ruxanda Renita (Chair Fundraising Committee) – Moldova
- Donovan Guttieres – France
- Moa Herrgard – Sweden
- Jolly Amatya – Nepal
- Aashish Khullar – India
- Khaled Eman (Representative of Secretariat) – Egypt

== See also ==
- Youth empowerment
- United Nations Conference on Sustainable Development
- List of youth empowerment organizations
