= IWG =

IWG may refer to:

- Inch of Water Gauge, pressure unit corresponding to 2.54 cmH_{2}O or approximately 249 Pa
- "I Wanna Go", song by Britney Spears
- Interagency Working Group such as the
  - Nazi War Crimes and Japanese Imperial Government Records Interagency Working Group
  - Interagency Working Group on Youth Programs
- IWG plc, a global provider of office space
- Irish Workers' Group
