= Aging out =

American popular culture vernacular

Aging out is American popular culture vernacular used to describe any time a youth leaves a formal system of care designed to provide services below a certain age level. The age at which a child “ages out” of foster care in the United States varies by state, and is usually between the ages of 18 and 21. Foster youth can choose to participate in extended foster care or not.

There are a variety of applications of the phrase throughout the youth development field. In respect to foster care, aging out is the process of a youth transitioning from the formal control of the foster care system towards independent living. It is used to describe anytime a foster youth leaves the varying factors of foster care, including home, school and financial systems. The United States Citizenship and Immigration Services defines "aging out" as when a person applies for lawful permanent resident (LPR) status as a child but turns 21 before being approved.

== Impacts ==
Often used to highlight the problems traditional foster care approaches face, aging out affects foster youth in a variety of ways such as homelessness, incarceration, substance abuse, and lower educational attainment. An estimated 30,000 adolescents age out of the foster care system each year in the United States. “By the age of 21, 23 percent will have experienced homelessness, 26 percent will have been incarcerated, and only 66 percent will have received a high school diploma or GED (AECF, 2019)”. “Moreover, less than 8 percent will receive a college degree, and 50 percent will still be unemployed by the age 24 (National Foster Youth Institute, 2017)”. These tribulations may be due in part to traumatic experiences in childhood, but they could also be due to the loss of resources and support at a young age.

Extending foster care gives foster youth longer access to housing, social, and financial support which "...reduces homelessness by 18 to 30 percent, incarceration by 36 to 46 percent, and disconnectedness (neither enrolled in school nor working) by 7 to 30 percent”.

== Former foster youth in education ==
Children who grow up in foster care have lower rates of high school and post-secondary education completion. Using the PRISMA methodology (Preferred Reporting Items for Systematic Reviews and Meta-Analyses), Gypen et al. (2017) systematically gathered published research articles from electronic databases such as PsycINFO, Springer, Science Direct, and Google Scholar. Their comprehensive review included articles under the terms "Foster care" or "Foster alumni" or "foster children" and "long-term perspectives" or "long-term results". The studies included participants aged 17 years and older (no age cap) gathering data from family service systems and child protective systems.

Dworsky and Courtney (2009) found that in child protective systems, only 64% had completed high school by the age of 19 and Pecora, Williams et al. (2006) found that by the age of 29, 85% had completed high school or completed a GED. The family service systems showed that 45% of foster students completed high school. Compared to the general population of 73%, this is considerably low. By the age of 23, that number increased to 73%, which is closer to the 83% of students not in foster care. Jackson and Cameron (2012) found similar findings. By the age of 18 only 33% had a high school diploma and by the age of 24, that number grew to 73%. Gypen et al. (2017) suggests that this means that if given more time, children who grew in foster care, have a higher chance of getting a high school diploma or GED.

When it comes to higher education, research shows that the number of students completing a two year, four year, or masters program to be even lower than high school completion rates. They also found that during the first year of college, children who age out of foster care were two times more likely to drop out, although there are indications that women have better outcomes than men (Naccarato et al. 2010). Pecora, Williams et al. (2006) found that 42.7% started education after high school but by the age of 25, only 9.6% were still enrolled. For those in the family service system, only 7.2% completed their bachelor’s and by the age of 23, only 1% had a Master's degree.

Naccarato et al. (2010) suggested a buddy system to help foster students through their educational journey, just like families provide similar support systems for those students not in foster care.

=== Statistics ===
The Child Welfare League of America reports that as many as 36% of foster youth who have aged out of the system become homeless, 56% become unemployed, and 27% of male former foster youth become jailed. The San Francisco Chronicle reports that less than half of emancipated youth who have aged out graduate from high school, compared to 85% of all 18- to 24-year-olds; fewer than 1 in 8 graduate from a four-year college; two-thirds had not maintained employment for a year; fewer than 1 in 5 was completely self-supporting; more than a quarter of the males spent time in jail; and 4 of 10 had become parents as a result of an unplanned pregnancy.

== Responses ==
Independent Living Programs (ILPs) are ways in which state and federal agencies have assisted foster youth in their transition to adulthood. “ILPs and services vary across and within states and are based on need and availability of funding”. In 1986, states began receiving federal funding for these programs. ILPs are separate from state custody and foster youth do not automatically get placed in these programs. Youth must hear about ILPs from a third party like caseworkers, foster parents, or self-discovery.

In 1970, Title X of the Public Health Service Act started providing for the federal family planning program, designed to provide resources for health services and counseling to low-income or uninsured individuals who may otherwise lack access to health care, including young people aging out of foster care. The United States Department of Housing and Urban Development's Family Unification Program provides Housing Choice Vouchers to young people aging out of the foster care system.

The Administration for Children's Services, and the federal Office of Housing Policy and Development, in cooperation with the New York City Housing Authority, has a Section 8 Priority Code for young people aging out of the foster care system.

In 1999, President Clinton signed the Foster Care Independence Act, which doubled federal funding for independent living programs and provides funding for drug abuse prevention and health insurance for former foster care youth until age 21.

The federal Fostering Connections Act of 2008 aimed to incentivize states into extending foster care beyond the age of 18 so that these foster youth could have longer access to support and services. This impacted roughly 31,500 youth per year as 22 states extended foster care.

Now programs and laws, such as the Chafee Foster Care Independence Program, are starting to make headway into ways to compensate foster children who have become adults. $140 million is to be funded for this program, including states matching 20%.

== See also ==
- Youth services
- Elevate (organization)
