= Presbyterian Youth Connection =

The Presbyterian Youth Connection is for all Presbyterian Church (U.S.A.) Youth and Adults. "Youth" is loosely defined as young people between the ages of 12 and 18. It is a common identity, theology, and structure for youth ministry across the Presbyterian Church and is based on a model that envisions youth and adults working together towards common ministry concerns and goals. It was founded at Presbyterian Youth Triennium and the General Assembly meeting in July 1995. It is the first youth ministry organization for the Presbyterian Church (U.S.A.).

At the 2003 Presbyterian Youth Connection Assembly, more than 500 high school students defeated a resolution calling on the larger church to "postpone the issue of the ordination of homosexuals" and voted to "affirm the call of homosexuals, bisexuals and transgendered persons to all areas of ministry".

There have been regionally sponsored Presbyterian Youth Connection events such as the Montreat Middle School conference in the summer of 2013.
