= AFS Youth Assembly =

Annual event in New York City

- Venue: United Nations Headquarters
- Location: New York City
- Type: Annual event
- Theme: UN SDGs
- Organised by: AFS Intercultural Programs
- Participants: 100+ each edition
- Website: www.youthassembly.org

The AFS Youth Assembly is an annual event organized by AFS Intercultural Programs to engage youth to address important global challenges and contribute to the United Nations Sustainable Development Goals (SDGs). The assembly brings together participants aged 17–35 from diverse backgrounds to collaborate, exchange ideas, and develop solutions for a better future. The assembly emphasizes intercultural understanding, youth leadership, solidarity, and social responsibility.

== History ==
The AFS Youth Assembly was established as part of AFS Intercultural Programs' mission to build a more just and peaceful world through intercultural exchange and education. Over the years, it has developed into a forum for young global citizens to engage with experts, policymakers, and peers on critical global issues. The assembly is designed to provide young people with the tools, skills, and networks needed to contribute to change in their communities and elsewhere.

== Themes ==
Each edition of the Assembly is centered around a specific theme that reflects current global priorities. Recent themes include "Breakthrough to a Better Future" for the 28th session in 2023, which addressed inequality, climate action, and education for employment, and "Forge Our Shared Future" for the 29th session in 2024, which addressed humanitarian crises, climate action, education innovation, and food security.

== Outcome ==
The Assembly provides participants with skills, networks, and opportunities to contribute as global citizens. The event promotes intercultural understanding and highlights youth leadership in addressing global challenges. Alumni of the assembly often pursue initiatives in their communities and advocate for youth representation in decision-making processes.
