= Namibian Economic Society =

The Namibian Economic Society was founded on 24 April 1999. It developed out of the Namibia Economic Working Group.

The aims of the society include the advancement of the "development of economics as science as well as its related academic disciplines", the fostering of "a spirit of national identity, a sense of unity and self-respect, as well as an in-depth awareness of social, economic, political, cultural, and environmental prospects and challenges facing Namibia" and the establishment and development of "relations with national, regional and international bodies of similar nature".
