= Youth ministry =

Age-specific religious ministry

Youth ministry, also commonly referred to as youth group, is an age-specific religious ministry of faith groups or other religious organizations, usually from ages 12 to 30, whose mission is to involve and engage with young people who attend their places of worship, or who live in their community. Christian youth ministry usually encompasses one or more of the following:

- encouraging young people (whether they have professed a faith or not) to learn more about a given faith and to become more involved in spiritual life
- providing open youth clubs or other activities for the common good of the young people, sometimes without an overtly religious agenda

Youth ministry often consists of students in sixth grade though twelfth grade and adult leaders. Every youth ministry is structured differently and the culture will vary among youth ministries depending on how the ministry cultivates culture. Some youth ministries are also student led where students take on the responsibility of planning services.

== Christianity ==
=== Protestantism ===
In Protestant churches, the term "ministry" often implies the service of an ordained minister or pastor. In youth ministry, however, this is not always the case — a youth ministry leader may be an ordained member of the clergy, an employed lay person, or a volunteer. Titles applied to youth ministry leaders vary widely as well, even within denominations, using terms such as "Youth Minister", "Youth Pastor", or simply "Youth Worker".

=== Catholicism ===
Catholic youth work covers a worldwide range of activities carried out with young people, usually in the name of the Catholic Church and with the intention of imparting the Catholic faith to them and inviting them to practice and live out the faith in their lives. Activities in the field range from small scale youth groups attached to parishes or Catholic schools, to large international gatherings, such as World Youth Day. It is a field which has evolved much over recent decades, especially in comparison to more formal methods of education or catechesis within the church. Nearly all dioceses and a great deal of parishes have some form of youth provision running, although a great deal of areas particularly in the developed world are finding youth work both more difficult and rare as the numbers of young people regularly practicing the Catholic faith continue to decline. In contrast, though, the new and exciting developments of recent decades and particularly the influence of the new movements within the church are ensuring that youth work continues to be an active and fruitful field.

==== Catholic young people ====
Unlike the case in some Protestant churches, a youth minister in the Roman Catholic Church is not a member of the clergy. Ministry, including youth ministry, is considered one of the functions within the Church because most believe that people should start learning about God at a young age so they have more time to grow spiritually through adulthood. Therefore, it is more likely for a Catholic youth minister or youth ministry leader to be a lay person, rather than an ordained priest.

== Unitarian Universalism ==
There are organizations within the Unitarian Universalist Association (the primary organization of Unitarian Universalist congregations in the United States), as well as within the Canadian Unitarian Council (the national body for Unitarian Universalist congregations in Canada), which minister to and with youth, of which Young Religious Unitarian Universalists (YRUU) is the largest and most apparent. YRUU strongly emphasizes youth empowerment, along with youth-adult partnership. There are also specific youth-oriented programs, such as Coming of Age, and Our Whole Lives, a lifespan sexuality education program with a youth age group.

== Education and career path ==
Youth ministers may be trained specifically to work with youth. Most congregations or places of worship have a strict vetting process for their youth ministers, including but not limited to background checks, educational requirements and previous relevant experience.

Many Bible and Christian universities and colleges now offer undergraduate and graduate degrees in youth ministry. While youth ministry was previously considered a stepping stone on the way to becoming priests, nuns and other important vocations, the trend is currently moving toward treating it as its own vocation.

== See also ==
- Christianity in the United States#Youth programs
- Sunday school
- Youth program
