= Reality Check (program) =

Youth program in New York, United States

Reality Check is a "youth-based, adult mentored" statewide youth program operated by the New York State Department of Health in Albany, New York. Founded in 2001, the goal of the program is to educate "teens about the manipulative marketing practices used by the tobacco industry to get teens to smoke." Thousands of youth across New York have participated in Reality Check activities, which operate in partnership with more than a dozen youth organizations across the state.

Reality Check has been involved in combating depictions of smoking in movies, point of purchase advertisements, and tobacco advertising found in the school setting. They have also participated in global campaigns against tobacco usage, particularly in Africa. They are also active across New York, frequently protesting at school board meetings and taking on the movie industry to end smoking in movies marketed to young people. Their work against movie studios and Hollywood has drawn attention to them as the "largest group to confront Hollywood" on tobacco usage in children's movies.

The program receives funding primarily from the state Department of Health. According to Cornell University, "Reality Check is NOT against smokers. It is about getting people to understand how tobacco companies manipulate people into smoking and getting hooked."

As of 31 July 2009, the number of Reality Check grants that the New York State Department of Health has been decreased from 46 to 10. As a result of this Monroe, Livingston, Steuben, Chemung, Schuyker, Tompkins, Yates, Seneca, Wayne, Ontario, Cortland, Chenango, Otsego, Delaware, Greene, Ulster, Sullivan, Orange, Rockland, Suffolk, Dutchess, Columbia, Rensselaer, and Washington County are left with no funding for any type of program similar to Reality Checks. Many other counties have exponential decreases in their funding.

== See also ==
- Youth voice
- Youth empowerment
- Youth movement
