= Round Table on Child Sexual Abuse (Germany) =

German working group

The Round Table on Child Sexual Abuse in Institutional and Familial Contexts was initiated by the German government in 2010. The working groups met throughout 2010 and 2011. They worked on a systematic appraisal of the situation, guidelines for behavior, and possible solutions in dealing with child sexual abuse using the guiding questions "What type of help and support do sexually abused persons need?", "What should be done in the event of a sexual crime?" and "What are the risk factors and protective factors in preventing sexual abuse of minors?"
