= Youth participatory action research =

Youth participatory action research (YPAR) is an integrative approach to both research and systems change that centers youth inquiry and youth leadership. As a form of participatory action research (PAR) and community-based participatory research (CBPR), YPAR is a reflective process of learning and action. Youth lead the research process, including defining a research question, collecting data, analyzing results, and using research findings to enact change in their school or community. Youth collect data that contributes to a body of systematic evidence and enact change through peer education, youth-led programming, youth organizing, and youth-led advocacy efforts to adults who have decision-making power over policies and practices which impact youth.

== History ==
YPAR developed from interdisciplinary participatory approaches in education, public health, and community psychology. YPAR builds on the history of action research as developed by organizational psychologist Kurt Lewin, and on larger social movements pursuing the liberation and empowerment of marginalized peoples across the Global South. Integrating these traditions, YPAR values and upholds the experience and expertise of those most impacted by the issue under study. Thus, youth are leaders in the cyclical process of research and action concerning the issues that directly impact them.

== Application ==
Students have utilized YPAR to address issues within their schools, working to increase school engagement, better relationships between students and staff, and implement changes to school policies and practices. YPAR has also been utilized by students to work toward social justice within their communities, addressing such issues as access to nutritious food, pollution and environmental concerns, and gender-based violence.

== Impact ==
Current research on the outcomes of YPAR emphasize the positive outcomes for youth self-determination and empowerment, connectedness and social support, and development of critical consciousness. This body of research has also shown that YPAR is an effective approach to building transferable academic and career skills, interpersonal skills like communication and leadership, and cognitive skills like critical thinking, problem solving, and decision-making.

== Resources ==
YPAR is an innovative research methodology supported by a number of institutional research centers. For example, interdisciplinary research hubs exist at UC Berkeley, Stanford, UC Davis, University of Pennsylvania, and at University of Virginia promoting YPAR and other youth-centered research. At UC Berkeley, The YPAR Hub supports YPAR practitioners with curriculum, resources, and background information, while the YPAR Network sponsors a diverse group of scholars and practitioners expanding and developing YPAR.
