= Youth program =

Activities meant for people between the ages of 10 and 25

Youth programs are particular activities designed to involve people between the ages of 10 and 25. Activities included are generally oriented towards youth development through recreation, social life, prevention, intervention, or education. During youth programs participants might be involved in sports, religion, community service, youth activism, youth service, or outdoor education. Topics covered include youth empowerment, consumer rights, youth-led media, and youth rights.

Youth program focuses and activities generally depend on the location, culture, class, education, and ideals of the individuals and organizations involved. These programs are offered by government agencies, nonprofit organizations, and businesses around the world.

== Examples ==
- 4-H
- YMCA
- Scouting
- TrashTag Challenge
- Boys and Girls Club
- National Youth Rights Association
- Youth model governments
- European Voluntary Service
- Elevate (organization)
- buildon
- The First Tee
- Civil Air Patrol
- United States Naval Sea Cadet Corps
- Forum for Young Canadians

== See also ==
- Youth development
- Youth participation
- List of youth organizations
- Interagency Working Group on Youth Programs
- Youth system
