= Coming of Age (Unitarian Universalism) =

Coming of Age Ritual

Coming of Age (CoA, COA) is a Unitarian Universalist program in which a congregation fosters the transition of its children into youth. Although COA programs vary by congregation, they typically mark the individual's transition from younger religious education programs into a youth group, District-level/Regional Young Religious Unitarian Universalists (YRUU), as well as National and Continental-level YRUU. Not all youth will enter into all of the levels of programming above, though entering into at least congregational-level YRUU (Youth group) is very common. At least one of the UUA districts holds a series of COA retreats to supplement congregational COA programs.

In most programs, a congregation's youth (usually aged 12 and above) are paired with adult mentors who are members of the congregation. Many programs ask youth to investigate their personal spirituality with the support of their mentors. Youth participants in the program are encouraged to develop a greater sense of what they believe. They do this through discussion, listening to guest speakers, and participating in retreats and workshops. Workshops may be designed to prompt the youth, challenge their modes of thinking, or aid them in furthering their ideas. Some congregations have also encouraged or required each child and mentor to do a social action or social service project together, or organized a service project which all participating youth and mentors do together, such as cooking and serving food at a soup kitchen.

At the end of many COA programs, youth and their mentors prepare a service in which they present "faith statements" or "credo statements"—written statements of belief and perspectives developed over the course of program. These statements vary in many ways, because there are few "guidelines" as to what youth may say. Typically, participants who do not wish to present a credo statement may communicate their findings in other ways; for example a choreographed dance or a musical piece they have written. Services vary from church to church and can involve almost anything that the participants want it to. Favorite hymns, dances, songs, and readings may be included.

For the most part, children identify with the faith beliefs of their parents and family. The Coming of Age program signals the beginning of individual spiritual searching; it is an official recognition that the youth involved have begun to search for personal truth.

== See also ==
- Coming of age
