= Foster Care Independence Act =

US legislation

Foster Care Independence Act of 1999
- Enacted by: the 106th United States Congress
- Effective: December 14, 1999

Citations
- Public law: Pub. L. 106–169 (text) (PDF)
- Statutes at Large: 113 Stat. 1882

Legislative history
- Introduced in the House by Nancy Johnson (R–CT) on November 18, 1999; Committee consideration by Ways and Means, Commerce; Passed the House on November 18, 1999 (Without objection); Passed the Senate on November 19, 1999 (Unanimous consent); Signed into law by President Bill Clinton on December 14, 1999

The Foster Care Independence Act of 1999 (Pub. L. 106–169 (text) (PDF), 113 Stat. 1882, enacted December 14, 1999) aims to assist youth aging out of foster care in the United States in obtaining and maintaining independent living skills. Youth aging out of foster care, or transitioning out of the formal foster care system, are one of the most vulnerable and disadvantaged populations. As youth age out of the foster care system at age 18, they are expected to become self-sufficient immediately, even though on average youth in the United States are not expected to reach self-sufficiency until age 26.

With the passage of the Foster Care Independence Act of 1999, funding was increased to enable states to design, conduct, and evaluate independent living programs with the purpose of assisting youth as they transition out of foster care. States are encouraged to create programs that support youth by addressing finances, housing, health, education, and employment. The bill also increases support to youth aging out of foster care in other ways, such as broadening the eligibility requirements to obtain Medicaid and increasing funding for adoption incentives.

The Act also included provisions relating to Social Security (OASDI) and Supplemental Security Income (SSI) programs and provides special cash benefits to World War II veterans.

== Overview ==
=== General ===
The Foster Care Independence Act of 1999 (Pub. L. 106–169 (text) (PDF), 113 Stat. 1882, enacted December 14, 1999) was signed into law by President Bill Clinton on December 14, 1999. The Act includes provisions relating to foster care and the OASDI and SSI programs. It also assists World War II veterans by providing special cash benefits. Title I of the bill includes the foster care provisions and Title II of the bill includes the OASDI and SSI provisions.

=== History ===
Over 20,000 youth age out of foster care each year and many are not prepared to live independently. Many youth are discharged from care with no social supports or assistance, resulting in lack of basic education, high rates of unemployment, homelessness, and dependence on public assistance programs. 12% of all foster youth report being homeless at least once since their discharge from foster care and 41% of homeless young people report having spent time in foster care. One-third of foster youth earn below $6,000 per year, which is well below the national poverty level.

Educational outcomes of ex-foster children in the Northwest Alumni Study*
- 56% completed high school compared to 82% of the general population, although an additional 29% of former foster children received a G.E.D. compared to an additional 5% of the general population.
- 42.7% completed some education beyond high school.
- 20.6% completed any degree or certificate beyond high school.
- 16.1% completed a vocational degree; 21.9% for those over 25.
- 1.8% complete a bachelor's degree, 2.7% for over 25, the completion rate for the general population in the same age group is 24%, a sizable difference.
*The study reviewed case records for 659 foster care alumni in Northwest USA, and interviewed 479 of them between September 2000 and January 2002.

Foster youth are more likely to have substance abuse issues, become parents soon after aging out of care, or end up incarcerated. One study reports that 56% of youth used "street drugs" while in foster care and 33% of youth report experiencing drug or alcohol problems since leaving care. Children who age out of foster care are at a high risk for mental illness; including posttraumatic stress disorder (PTSD), depression, anxiety, and attachment disorders. 15% of foster youth have attempted or contemplated suicide and 1 in 6 youth have a chronic mental illness. In one study concerning foster youth, the rate of PTSD in adults who were in foster care for one year between the ages of 14 and 18 was found to be higher than that of combat veterans, with 25 percent of those in the study meeting the diagnostic criteria as compared to 12–13 percent of Iraq War veterans and 15 percent of Vietnam War veterans, and a rate of 4% in the general population. More than half the study participants reported clinical levels of mental illness, compared to less than a quarter of the general population.

Policy reform to aid foster youth was initiated in the 1980s by service providers and researchers who realized early on the poor outcomes associated with foster youth. The first policy impacting youth aging out of the foster system was the Federal Independent Living Initiative of 1986. The next landmark legislation came in 1997, when the Adoption and Safe Families Act (ASFA) was passed. This reduced the time children remained in foster care before being available for adoption. The law requires state child welfare agencies to identify cases where "aggravated circumstances" make permanent separation of child from the birth family the best option for the safety and well-being of the child. One of the main components of ASFA is the imposition of stricter time limits on reunification efforts. Proponents of ASFA claimed that before the law was passed, the lack of such legislation was the reason it was common for children to languish in care for years with no permanent living situation identified. In conjunction with the passage of the Adoption and Safe Families Act, the National Foster Care Awareness Project as created. The project is a group created with the shared goal of supporting foster youth, and the Foster Care Independence Act was instituted in part by the National Foster Care Awareness Project.

== Independent living provisions ==
The purpose of the Foster Care Independence Act is to provide states with flexible funding that will enable children likely to "age out" of foster care at age 18 to obtain employment, continue their education, accept personal responsibility, and prepare for the transition from adolescence to adulthood. The program aims to help foster youth transition out of foster care by encouraging self-sufficiency through funding that will allow for States to design and conduct programs that include:

- Assistance obtaining a high school diploma
- Career exploration
- Vocational training
- Job placement and retention
- Budgeting and financial management skills
- Training in activities of daily living
- Substance abuse prevention
- Preventative health; such as smoking cessation, nutrition, and pregnancy prevention

Program funding is used to provide independent living support services to youth both before and after aging out of foster care. Funding supports financial, housing, counseling, employment, educational, and other supportive programs for transitioning youth. Additional funding promotes interactions with mentors and dedicated adults to provide personal and emotional support to foster youth. With the passage of the act, federal funding for the Independent Living Program was doubled from $70 million to $140 million a year. However, states must contribute a 20 percent state match for Independent Living Program funds and use federal training funds to help foster parents address issues confronting adolescents preparing for independent living.

=== Use of independent living funds ===
States may apply funds for a period of five consecutive years through an application process that requires submission of a plan that meets requirements of a program that supports transitioning foster youth. Applications for funding must include plans including how the state will design and deliver programs, ensure that youth in various stages of transition will be served, and involve both public and private agencies in planning for independent living. State agencies are expected to administer, supervise, and oversee the programs carried out under the plan.

The Act requires that states receiving funds develop outcome measures to assess the performance of independent living programs. States must measure data that includes educational attainment, high school graduation rates, employment, homelessness, non-marital childbirth, and incarceration. States must report data regarding the success of independent living program to Congress, or be subject to penalties for noncompliance.

=== Medicaid provisions ===
The Act also increases health care options for youth aging out of foster care by making changes to the Medicaid law permitting states to provide Medicaid coverage to youth upon aging out of foster care, up to the age of 21. Provisions also allow for former foster youth who are considered low income to be provided with Medicaid coverage by permitting foster youths to have assets up to $10,000 without compromising their assistance.

=== Adoption assistance provisions ===
The Act increases funding for adoption incentive payments, which are bonuses to states for increasing the number of children adopted from public foster care, as opposed to youth remaining in foster care. Additional funding for adoption incentive payments enables States to receive the full amount of the earned bonuses due to increasing adoption rates.

== OASDI and SSI provisions ==
Official SSA Seal

Title II of the Act includes provisions relating to OASDI and SSI provisions. Provisions aim to reduce overpayment and fraud. The Act also contains provisions authorizing a study to determine reasons why family farmers are denied SSI benefits. The following are summary descriptions of the Social Security Administration (SSA) provisions:

=== Liability of representative payees ===
- Makes representative payees liable for any OASDI or SSI overpayment made to a beneficiary who is deceased.
- Requires the SSA to create a record under the representative payee's Social Security Number to establish overpayment control.

=== Recovery of overpayments ===
- SSI overpayments must be recovered from SSI lump sum amounts by withholding 50 percent of the lump sum amount of the overpayment.

=== Debt collection ===
- Extends the debt collection practices available for OASDI overpayments to the SSI program.

=== Requirement to provide state prisoner information ===
- Prisoner information must be reported to Federal or federally assisted cash, food, or medical assistance programs.

=== Treatment of assets held in trust ===
- For SSI purposes, the assets of any trust containing property transferred from an individual or an individual's spouse, will be included as countable resources.
- An earnings or additions to a trust will be counted as the individual's income.
- Application of the provision to include trust contributions can be waived in cases of "undue hardship," to ensure that SSI beneficiaries who lose their SSI benefits because of assets held in trust will not automatically lose Medicaid benefits.

=== Disposal of resources ===
- Provides a penalty of loss of SSI benefits for up to 36 months for the disposal of resources at less than fair market value.

=== Penalties for false or misleading statements ===
- For individuals who made a "statement or representation of material fact" for use in determining SSI or OASDI benefits, a penalty is imposed.
- Deletes the provision that denies benefits for 10 years to any individual convicted of making a fraudulent statement in order to simultaneously collect assistance payments in two or more States.

=== Exclusion of representatives and health care providers ===
- If representatives and/or healthcare providers are found to have helped committed fraud, they are barred from the OASDI and SSI programs.
- The bar would last 5 years for a first offense, 10 years for a second offense, and permanent exclusion for a third offense.

=== State data exchanges ===
- Require that the SSA's privacy standards for data sharing meet the State Privacy Standard.

=== Study to improve fraud prevention ===
- Requires that a study be completed to identify measures to reduce OASDI and SSI fraud.
- Includes study to improve processing of beneficiaries reporting change or income.
- Requires a report of recommendations from the study to the United States House Committee on Ways and Means and the Senate Finance Committee.

=== Annual reporting ===
- Requires that the SSA include in its annual budget an itemization of the amount of funds required to support efforts to combat fraud by applicants and beneficiaries .

=== Computer matches with institutionalization data ===
- Requires periodic matches with Medicare and Medicaid data held by the Secretary of Health and Human Services (HHS).

=== Access to information ===
- Provides that SSI applicants and beneficiaries may be required to provide authorization to the SSA to obtain financial records from any financial institution.
- Refusal to provide authorization to the SSA to obtain financial records may result in ineligibility for SSI.

=== Study of denial of SSI benefits for family farmers ===
- Requires a study to determine the reasons why family farmers with resources under $100,000 are denied benefits.
- The study would include whether the policies discriminate against family farmers, and the number family farmers who have been denied benefits in each of the past 10 years.

== Provisions for special benefits to certain World War II veterans ==
The Foster Care Independence Act also establishes a new title VIII of the Social Security Act that entitles certain World War II veterans to a monthly SSI benefit. "Every individual who is a qualified individual... shall, in accordance with and subject to the provisions of this title, be entitled to a monthly benefit paid by the Commissioner of Social Security for each month after September 2000 (or such earlier month, if the Commissioner determines is administratively feasible) the individual resides outside the United States." Qualified individuals are considered individuals who:

- Are 65 years of age or older
- Are World War II veteran;
- Are eligible for a supplemental security income benefit under title XVI
- Have a total benefit income that is less than 75 percent of the Federal benefit rate under title XVI
- Have filed an application for benefits under this title
- Are in compliance with all requirements imposed by the Commissioner of Social Security under this title

== Legislative history ==
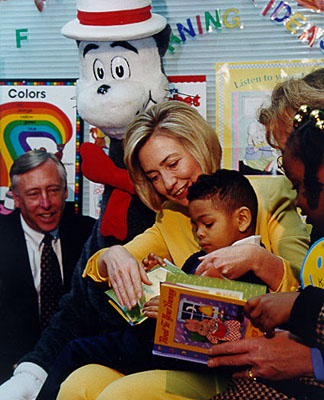
Clinton reads to a child during a school visit (1998).

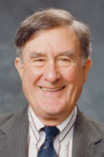
Senator John Chafee from Rhode Island

First Lady of the United States Hillary Clinton was instrumental in passage of the bill, first holding a youth conference on the issues involved and then lobbying the United States Congress in support of legislation. It followed in the wake of her support for the earlier Adoption and Safe Families Act of 1997, which made it easier to adopt foster children; the Foster Care Independence Act was intended to ease the transition into adulthood of foster children who did not get adopted.

Passage of the bill itself was non-controversial: H.R. 3443 was introduced in the U.S. House of Representatives on November 18, 1999, by Congresswoman Nancy Johnson of Connecticut, via the House Committee on Ways and Means and the House Committee on Commerce, and was passed on the House floor without objection. On November 19, it was passed in the U.S. Senate by unanimous consent.

Upon signing the bill into law, President Bill Clinton stated:

Hillary and I are very pleased that the Congress today approved H.R. 3443, "Foster Care Independence Act of 1999." This legislation helps ensure that young people in foster care get the tools they need to make the most of their lives. It builds on proposals in my budget to empower those leaving foster care by providing them access to health care, better educational opportunities, training, housing assistance, counseling, and other support and services. We cannot let these young people walk their tough road alone.

With the passage of the Foster Care Independence Act of 1999, the name of the Independent Living Program was changed to the John H. Chafee Foster Care Independence Program as a testimonial to the late Senator Chafee (R-RI). Senator Chafee was the Senate sponsor of the legislation. Senator Chafee recognized the need for special support and assistance for youth transitioning out of foster care. Senator Chafee was also a vocal advocate for abused and neglected children.

== See also ==
- Foster Care
- Adoption and Safe Families Act
- Aging out
