= Camp Unirondack =

Summer camp and conference center in New York, US

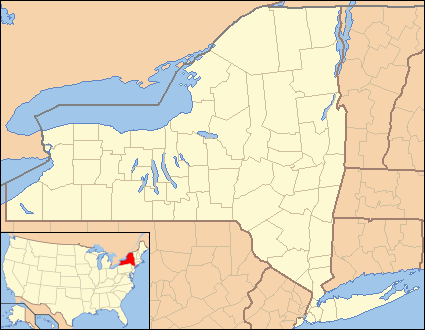
- Location within the state of New York
- Location: Lewis County, New York, U.S.
- Coordinates: 43°52′11.58″N 075°9′19″W
- Established: 1951
- Website: www.unirondack.org

Camp Unirondack is a Unitarian Universalist summer camp and conference center that is located in the western foothills of the Adirondack Mountains near Lowville, New York, the site of John Patterson's summer estate. Patterson was the founder of the National Cash Register company.

The camp was founded in 1951 when the New York State Convention of Universalists purchased 9 acres (36,000 m^{2}) of a "forever wild" peninsula on Beaver Lake (a part of the Beaver River flow) near the border of the Adirondack Park. Unirondack is a member of the Council of Unitarian Universalist Camps & Conferences and serves the Saint Lawrence Unitarian Universalist District and the Metro New York City Unitarian Universalist District, as well as bordering regions, including Quebec, Ontario, Pennsylvania and Ohio. Each UU church in the region has a liaison to the Camp Unirondack Board.

== History ==
In the 1950s through the 1970s, summer sessions for different age groups were often organized around liberal educational themes. For example, World Citizenship Camp for middle schoolers explored cultural programming and relations between many different countries, often employing foreign exchange college students as counsellors. Liberal American kids often made their first acquaintances with people from Asia, Africa and Europe during these sessions. Another session was set aside for Liberal Religious Youth of high-school age in the Iroquois Federation, and later also the Mohawk Federation of upstate New York, who organized their own programs each year. One of the founders of Unirondack, Rev. Howard Gilman, was particularly well known for his efforts to bring inner-city youth outdoors to the Adirondacks during this period, where they met multi-ethnic age-group counterparts from less urban environments and formed lifelong friendships. Many learned to swim, canoe and fish in Beaver Lake and enjoyed the fellowship of singing around campfires each night, all non-urban experiences.

== Programming ==
The camp has a sand beach on Beaver Lake, athletic fields, many row boats and canoes, and a combination boathouse/arts and crafts studio. Outdoor recreation, exploration, social events, educational activities, and arts and crafts are a regular part of camp programming.

Although Unirondack hosts spring and fall sessions and works weekends throughout the year, The focus of the camp is the summer sessions. The summer sessions are named after famous Unitarians or Universalists. Each is a week-long and is for a specific age range of campers:

- Barton, for ages 9–12
- Channing I & II, for ages 12–14
- Parker I & II, for ages 14–16
- Ballou I & II, for older 15-18 yr olds
- Trip Camp, for ages 15–18
- Family Camp for all ages

The camp also organizes week-long backpacking and canoeing trips throughout the summer. UU Congregations in the region may lease the camp for weekend retreats or meetings, or may visit the camp for "work/play weekends", a low-key way to enjoy the woods and contribute to the upkeep of the camp. Attendees spend Saturday morning cleaning and repairing facilities and the rest of the weekend hiking, canoeing, or otherwise relaxing in the outdoors.
