= Kathmandu Debates =

High school debating championship

Kathmandu Debates

General Information
- Started: 2013 by Sano Sansar Initiative
- Website: www.sanosansar.org/ktmdebates
- Key People: Sagar Aryal, "Initiator"; Pradeep Ghimire, "Tournament Director"
- Focus: Karl Popper Debating Championship
- Facebook: Kathamandu-Debates-Official-Site

The Kathmandu Debates is a high school debating championship led by the youth of the Sano Sansar Initiative. The program aims to provide a platform to encourage young people to engage in social, political, and sustainable economic development issues through the use of the positive aspects of debating.

The 2013 Kathmandu Debates commenced with educational tracks focused on providing knowledge of debating in the Karl Popper Debating Championship Format to the students in Nepal. More than a hundred young, amateur students participated in the debate tournament, organized with support from the American Embassy in Kathmandu. Nepal is one of the countries mostly dependent on remittances. The finals of the debate consisted of the motion "THBT [This house believes that] State should prioritize Foreign Investment to Labor Export as Major Economic Strategy". The final debate took place on February 7, 2013, the 7th Anniversary of the Sano Sansar Initiative.

== Format ==
The Kathmandu Debates Tournament was organized in the KPDC (Karl Popper Debating Championship) Format. Teams were composed of four students accompanied by a debate coach. Due to the lack of debating culture in Nepal and with KPDC being a new style of debate in Nepal, the 2013 Kathmandu Debates held a three-day educational track for the students.
