= Youth leadership =

Youth leadership is the practice of teens exercising authority over themselves or others.

Youth leadership has been elaborated upon as a theory of youth development in which young people gain skills and knowledge necessary to lead civic engagement, education reform and community organizing activities. Countless programs around the world seek to teach young people particular skills associated with leadership, particularly those programs associate with youth voice or youth empowerment. According to the study, it should increase the capacity of both individuals and communities.

Models of youth leadership focus on several aspects, including youth voice, youth empowerment and youth engagement for young people of color, low-income youth and youth of other diverse identities and abilities.

== Examples ==
- 4-H
- AIESEC International
- Air Training Corps
- Amigos de las Americas
- Bangladesh Youth Leadership Center
- Boys & Girls Clubs of America
- Boy Scouts of America
- Civil Air Patrol
- Congressional Youth Leadership Council
- Girl Scouts of the USA
- Global Leadership Adventures
- Halogen Foundation
- Junior Reserve Officers' Training Corps
- National Hispanic Institute
- National Youth Leadership Council
- National Youth Leadership Training (BSA)
- Oaktree
- Palestinian Youth Association for Leadership and Rights Activation
- Red Cross Youth
- Rotary Youth Leadership Awards
- Spirit of Enniskillen Trust
- Student Catholic Action
- Toastmasters International
- UpRising
- World Association of Girl Guides and Girl Scouts
- World Organization of the Scout Movement
- Young Foundation
- Young India Foundation
- Youth Parliament Program

== See also ==
- Youth voice
- Youth rights
