= SEALNet =

US-based non-profit organization

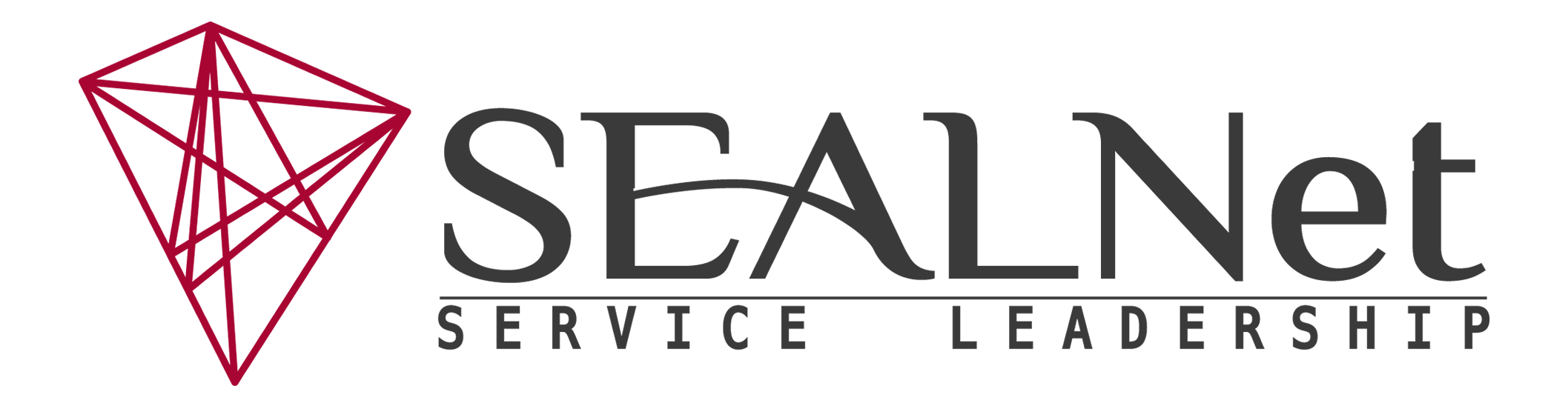
- Formation: 2004
- Type: 501(c)(3)
- Purpose: Service leadership
- Headquarters: HQ at Stanford University, Palo Alto, California, with chapters at M.I.T. in Boston, Massachusetts and Singapore
- Website: sealnetonline.org

The Southeast Asian Service Leadership Network, SEALNet, is a 501(c)(3) non-profit organization based in the San Francisco Bay Area, United States, dedicated to service leadership and working with Southeast Asian communities around the world. SEALNet was founded in 2004 by undergraduate students at Stanford University in collaboration with members from the Southeast Asian Leadership Initiative (SALI). In 2006, SEALNet and SALI merged under the SEALNet name.

SEALNet's mission is to promote service leadership among Southeast Asian communities in the US and abroad. It accomplishes this by building and nurturing a community of service leaders who are committed to serve.

== History ==
Founded in 2004 at Stanford University by Southeast Asian undergraduates under the mentorship of SALI members, SEALNet conducted its first project in the summer of 2005 in Ho Chi Minh City, Vietnam. The project worked at the Ho Chi Minh City Youth Union to provide computers and English language learning software to students and with a group of high school students to teach them skills of leadership and project design.

In 2007, SEALNet was given a grant by the Singapore MFA as part of the ASEAN 40th anniversary celebrations. By the end of the 2010 project cycle, SEALNet's all-volunteer community has organized over 28 projects across seven of the 10 ASEAN countries (all except Singapore, Brunei, and Myanmar). There are over 1000 members of SEALNet (high school students, college students and mentor professionals) from around the world.

Members are trained in service and leadership. One major training event is the annual Service Leadership Training Retreat. The first training retreat was run in 2005 at the Wildwood Retreat in Santa Rosa, California.

== Chapters ==
SEALNet has chapters at Stanford University and M.I.T. in the United States and a chapter at NUS in Singapore. The organization's finances and administration within the United States is conducted by the 501(c)(3) registered within the State of California, "SEALNet, Inc." In Singapore, the finances and administration are conducted by the registered Public Company Limited by Guarantee "SEALNet (Singapore) Limited." SEALNet's long-term goals include the addition of more chapters within the United States and across Southeast Asia. All of the chapters are overseen by the Board of Directors of the 501(c)(3) organization and by the board of trustees.

== See also ==
- Youth empowerment

== Further Information ==
- SEALNet official website
- SEALNet (Singapore) official website
