= Young People's Religious Union =

The Young People's Religious Union (YPRU) was a Unitarian Youth organization founded in 1896. The organization celebrated by the Unitarian Young People's Sunday held annual meetings beginning in 1918 through 1950. Of note was the annual conference held at Star Island, part of the Isles of Shoals off the coast of Portsmouth, NH. Topics discussed at meetings of the organization included Christian Patriotism.

It was superseded by Liberal Religious Youth in 1953, as Unitarianism and Universalism came ever-closer together, but before the official consolidation in 1961.
