= Young Muslim Advisory Group =

- Abbreviation: YMAG
- Formation: October 2008
- Purpose: Youth representation
- Headquarters: London
- Region served: United Kingdom
- Members: 23
- Official language: English
- Parent organization: Communities and Local Government
- Website: YMAG.opm.co.uk

The Young Muslim Advisory Group (YMAG) is a government advisory group in the United Kingdom, consisting of 23 members between the ages of 16 and 21.

== History ==
In July and August 2008, the Community Secretary Hazel Blears and Children and Families Secretary Ed Balls began recruiting young Muslims to become advisors to the government.

On 7 October 2008, the Young Muslim Advisory Group was launched to work with the Government to find solutions to a range of challenges including tackling discrimination; increasing employment levels; preventing extremism and boosting civic participation. The structure of advisory group includes regional representatives who are accompanied by a peer network of young people. The first meeting between the two Ministers and the advisory group was held on 12 February 2009.

On 5 January 2009, the Young Muslim Advisory Group sent a letter to the British Prime Minister Gordon Brown to express their condemnation of the Israeli–Palestinian conflict.

On 21 March 2009, the Young Muslim Advisory group held a national conference called "Dialogue" to consult with young Muslims from across England.

== Funding ==
The Young Muslim Advisory Group is funded by the Department for Communities and Local Government along with the Department for Children, Schools and Families.

== Reception ==
The think-tank Centre for Social Cohesion reported "mixed reactions" to the creation of the Young Muslim Advisory Group.

The organisation has been criticised by Baroness Sayeeda Warsi, the Conservative Party Shadow Minister for Community Cohesion, who said in an article featured in the Daily Telegraph, "It is another example of Labour's discredited policy of state multiculturalism and (YMAG) would just drive communities in Britain further apart." The comments of Baroness Sayeeda Warsi were shared by Zehra Zaidi, a columnist for the Guardian as the group would operate by "reinforcing difference". Similarly, the Sikh Community Action Network, in an open letter to British Prime Minister Gordon Brown, use the Young Muslim Advisory Group as an example of "unprecedented concessions and measures" towards the Muslim community, whilst "The rest of the population remains ignored, excluded and forgotten." The group has also received criticism from the British National Party.

== See also ==
- UK Youth Parliament
