= Northern Ireland Youth Forum =

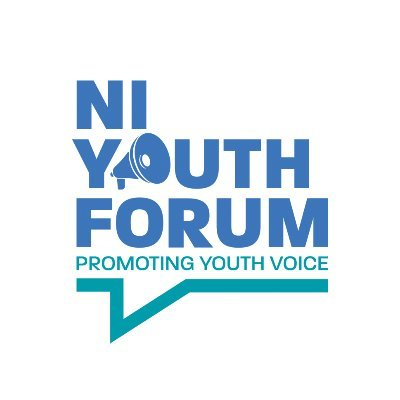
- Abbreviation: NIYF
- Formation: 1979
- Type: Registered charity
- Purpose: Youth representation
- Headquarters: Belfast
- Region served: Northern Ireland
- Chairperson: Cohen Taylor
- Main organ: Executive Committee
- Website: NIYF

The Northern Ireland Youth Forum (NIYF) is a youth organisation in the United Kingdom, consisting of volunteer members aged between 11 and 25. According to their constitution, the Northern Ireland Youth Forum exists to inspire, motivate, empower and support young people to have a voice and effect change on personal; peer; community and societal levels.

The Youth Forum is established to empower young people to challenge disadvantage and inequality; effect change and contribute to building a just, fair and equal society; and to help young people who do not have what they need because of poverty, who are being treated unfairly or because they don’t have the help and support, they need when they need it.

The Youth Forum works to promote the voice and benefit of young people; primarily in Northern Ireland; and also within the Republic of Ireland; Great Britain; Europe and further afield and to educating and supporting such young people so as to develop their personal, physical and mental capacities, that they may develop holistically as individuals and members of society and that their conditions of life may be improved.

== NIYF Executive Committee ==
The NIYF is a youth led organisation that lobbies, advocates, promotes and fights for the rights of young people in Northern Ireland. The primary aim is to build the confidence and awareness of all young people so that they can assert their rights as listed by the United Nations Convention on the Rights of the Child.

The Executive Committee are responsible for the management of the Youth Forum. The Executive set the priorities for the Youth Forum and they employ a staff team to carry out this work.

The Committee for 2023 – 2026 were elected at the AGM during September 2023 and are listed below.

Chairperson	Cohen Taylor
Vice Chairperson	Aoife Murphy
Honorary Secretary	Ciara Ní hUisceith
Treasurer	Eóin Millar
Press & Communications Officer	James Reynolds
Policy Officer	Carla Hannan
Global Youth Work Officer	Ahmad Adam
Executive Committee Member	Tristin Nicholls
Executive Committee Member	Tomás Murphy
Executive Committee Member	Jack Dalzell
Executive Committee Member	Ryan Kearney
Executive Committee Member	Laura Blackledge
Executive Committee Member	Eimear Criozier
Executive Committee Member	Claire Ní hUisceith
Executive Committee Member	Brooke Kearney
Executive Committee Member	Genevieve McCollum
Executive Committee Member	Ellen Taylor
Executive Committee Member	Kseniia Heorhiieva

== History ==
The Northern Ireland Youth Forum was created by the Department of Education in 1979 to ensure that young people's opinions were heard and valued by government. As part of the Youth Sector, the Youth Forum was asked to help young people engage in decision-making about the delivery of services such as youth clubs, local youth councils, as well as in wider society.

Today the Youth Forum's mantra is ‘promoting the voice of young people’, and it works with young people across Northern Ireland to ensure they are able to fully participate in making decisions within their community.

== Membership ==
The Youth Forum is a member-based organisation, which means that it gets its direction and focus from the young people it is created to work for. Membership is open to all young people living in Northern Ireland aged between 11 and 25 who support the core values and aims of the Youth Forum.

Members are encouraged to take an active role in the life of the organisation, including standing for election to the executive committee. Members also receive our monthly email newsletter ‘eBumpfh’ that contains information about current work, training opportunities, and exciting events.

Members are encouraged to keep in touch with the Membership Development Worker to inform them of the work that they are doing in their local area or youth club. Through the online discussion forum Members can talk about issues that they care about, feed into ongoing consultations that are managed by the Youth Forum, and make friends with other Members.

== Areas of focus ==
The forum lists five main focal points of its work, detailed below.

- Working with young people
- Speaking up, fighting for and making change in Northern Ireland
- Getting young people involved in the work of the Northern Ireland Youth Forum
- Getting the message out from politicians, organisations and the forum
- Looking to the future and constantly improving the four aforementioned focal points.

== UK Youth Parliament ==
The NIYF also fills the position of a regional body of the UK Youth Parliament; as such it remains involved in national and local campaigns. Currently the forum holds positions on the Procedures group and Board of Trustees of the UKYP.
