= Adventures of the Mind =

Coordinates: 37.759665°N 122.421509°W

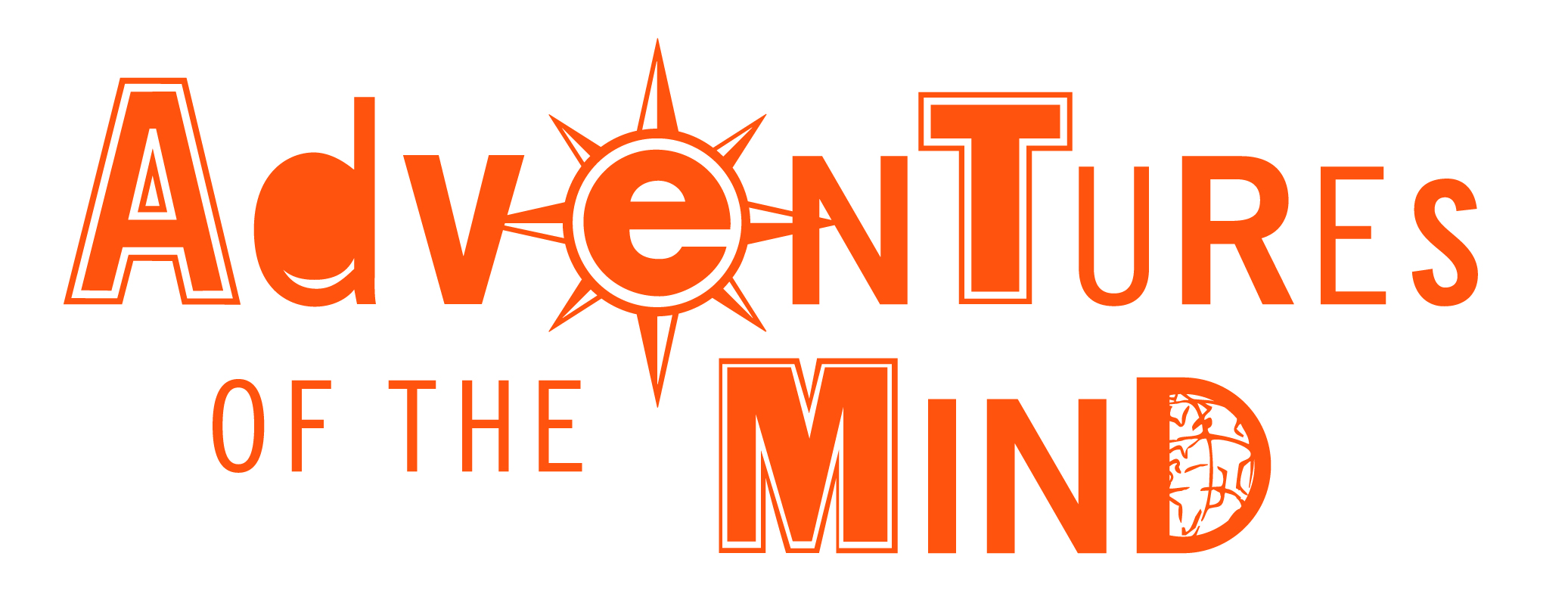
- Adventures of the Mind Logo
- Formation: 2003
- Founder: Victoria Gray
- Type: Non-Profit
- Legal status: Active
- Purpose: Youth empowerment
- Website: Adventures of the Mind

Adventures of the Mind is an achievement-focused mentoring camp for talented America high school students. Educators from across the United States of America nominate students whom they believe, with guidance and nurture, can maximize their potential and make important contributions to society. Honored guests share their life stories that can serve as a road map to the students on their own personal paths to success.

== History ==
Adventures of the Mind is an American youth mentoring camp founded in 2003 by Victoria Gray. Organized by Student Achievement & Advocacy Services, the non-profit program hosts high school students for a seven-day camp. The camp connects selected teenagers with adult mentors across various fields, including science, literature, journalism, arts, and public service.

== Past camps ==
Previous Adventures of the Mind Summit
Year	Summit Location	City & State
2015	Rosemont College	Rosemont, PA
2014	Occidental College	Los Angeles, CA
2012	New York University	New York, NY
2011	University of Montana	Missoula, MT
2009	Institute for Advanced Study and Princeton University	Princeton, NJ
2007	Morehouse College	Atlanta, GA
2005	SLAC National Accelerator Laboratory and Googleplex	Stanford, CA
2003	Chihuly Boathouse	Seattle, WA

== Student selection process ==
Student attendees are selected through a personalized and rigorous search that goes beyond traditional measures of achievement — grades and test scores — by asking teachers to personally nominate a teen. Attendees are chosen regardless of learning disabilities, socioeconomic factors, or other obstacles that may obscure real potential. Additionally, participants are chosen from runners-up in national competitions ranging from the Presidential Scholars Program to the Intel Science Talent Search to the National Poetry Slam. Adventures of the Mind targets high potential students who may not yet garner the same level of recognition as their peers, but would benefit just as much from the experience the camp provides.

== Mentors ==
Mentors represent a wide variety of backgrounds and fields including arts, business, literature, public service, philanthropy, science and more.

- Sergey Brin
- Ingrid Daubechies
- Rita Dove
- Annie Duke
- Bonnie Dunbar
- Murray Gell-Mann
- John R. Horner
- Nathan Myhrvold
- Lisa Randall
- Amy Tan
- Luis von Ahn
- Herschel Walker
