= Gordon Wilson (peace campaigner) =

Irish politician (1925–1995)

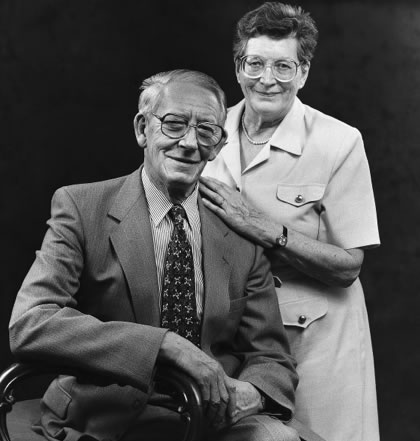
- Wilson with his wife Joan
- Born: 25 September 1927; Manorhamilton, County Leitrim, Ireland
- Died: 27 June 1995 (aged 67); Enniskillen, County Fermanagh, Northern Ireland
- Occupations: Draper, peace campaigner, politician

Senator
- In office 17 February 1993 – 27 June 1995
- Constituency: Nominated by the Taoiseach

Personal details
- Party: Independent
- Known for: Forgiving IRA bombers and opposing loyalist revenge
- Spouse: Joan Wilson
- Children: 3

Gordon Wilson (25 September 1927 – 27 June 1995) was a draper in Enniskillen, County Fermanagh, who became known internationally as a peace campaigner during the Troubles in Northern Ireland.

On 8 November 1987 a bomb planted by the Provisional IRA exploded during Enniskillen's Remembrance Day parade, injuring Wilson and fatally injuring his daughter Marie, a nurse. In an emotional television interview with the BBC only hours after the bombing, Wilson described his final conversation with his dying daughter as they both lay buried in rubble and his hand held tightly to his daughter. His words "I bear no ill will. I bear no grudge" were reported worldwide, becoming among the most-remembered quotations from the Troubles. Whereas IRA attacks in Northern Ireland often resulted in reprisals by loyalists, Wilson's calls for forgiveness and reconciliation came to be called the Spirit of Enniskillen.

As a peace campaigner, Wilson held many meetings with members of Sinn Féin. He also met once with representatives of the Provisional IRA. Wilson sought to understand the reasons for the Remembrance Day bombing in Enniskillen. He also held talks with loyalist paramilitaries in an attempt to persuade them to abandon violence.

== Bombing ==
I bear no ill will. I bear no grudge.
Excerpt of BBC interview with Gordon Wilson

On 8 November 1987, Enniskillen held its annual Remembrance Sunday ceremony to honour those who had served in the British Armed Forces. The Provisional IRA had planted a 40 lb (18 kg) bomb in the town's Reading Rooms behind the cenotaph. It was timed to go off at 10:43 am just before the ceremony was due to start. The explosion killed 11 people and injured 64; the last victim died after lying in a coma for 13 years.

The blast buried Wilson and his daughter, Marie, in rubble. Unable to move, he held her hand and comforted her as she lay dying, her last words were, "Daddy, I love you very much". Five minutes later rescuers pulled Wilson and his daughter out from under the collapsed building. Marie never regained consciousness and died later in hospital.

The BBC would later describe the bombing as a turning point in the Troubles because the attack shook the IRA "to its core". Pivotal to the change in attitude towards this sort of attack was Wilson's reaction to the death of his daughter. The 60-year-old draper publicly forgave those who had planted the bomb and said he would pray for them. He also begged that no-one take revenge for Marie's death and pleaded with loyalists not to do so.

On Remembrance Day 1997, Sinn Féin leader Gerry Adams formally apologised for the bombing.

== Peace campaigner ==
=== Mediator ===
William Ury wrote in his 1999 book The Third Side:

In an interview with the BBC, Wilson described with anguish his last conversation with his daughter and his feelings toward her killers: "She held my hand tightly, and gripped me as hard as she could. She said, 'Daddy, I love you very much.' Those were her exact words to me, and those were the last words I ever heard her say." To the astonishment of listeners, Wilson went on to add, "But I bear no ill will. I bear no grudge. Dirty sort of talk is not going to bring her back to life. She was a great wee lassie. She loved her profession. She was a pet. She's dead. She's in heaven and we shall meet again. I will pray for these men tonight and every night." As historian Jonathan Bardon recounts, "No words in more than twenty-five years of violence in Northern Ireland had such a powerful, emotional impact."

He contacted senior members of the IRA following the bombings which killed two boys in Warrington, England in 1993. Despite his begging them to stop, the IRA issued a statement offering "sincerest condolences and apologies" for his daughter's death. Wilson said his efforts had been "quite pointless"; he also noted that some Protestants never forgave him for meeting the IRA.

=== Spirit of Enniskillen Trust ===
In 1989 Wilson helped launch a community outreach programme entitled the Spirit of Enniskillen Trust which helped young people in Northern Ireland participate in international undertakings. The Trust gave bursaries to promote reconciliation in Northern Ireland. "The idea was to encourage young people aged between 16 and 19 from Northern Ireland to travel outside the Province and to use their experience to help build community bridges at home". The Trust closed in 2013 due to financial problems.

=== Senator ===
In 1993, Wilson was named by Albert Reynolds as a Taoiseach's nominee to the Seanad. He served until his death in 1995.

== Personal life ==
William Gordon Wilson was born in the town of Manorhamilton in County Leitrim in the Irish Free State on 25 September 1927, a few years after the partition of Ireland. His parents, George Wilson and Henrietta Conn, had married in 1926. Wilson was the eldest of four children, had a happy childhood in a strongly Methodist household, with his three sisters Joan, Wilma and Dorothy. Educated at Wesley College, Dublin, Wilson was a man of strong Christian faith and attended Enniskillen Methodist Church. He spent most of his adult life running the family drapery shop in High Street, Enniskillen, County Fermanagh.

== Death ==
Wilson died of a heart attack in 1995, aged 67, just a few months after the death of his son, Peter, in a road accident. He was survived by his wife, Joan, and their daughter Julie-Anne. His wife, Joan Wilson, died on 31 March 2023.

== Legacy ==
People who had met Wilson in the course of his peace work have described him as one of the most inspiring and caring men they had ever met.

Wesley College Dublin, where Wilson went to school as a teenager, renamed their library to the Gordon Wilson Library after his death. His widow was present at the ceremony.
