= Sano Sansar Initiative =

- Logo of Sano Sansar Initiative
- Abbreviation: SSI
- Formation: February 2006; 20 years ago
- Type: Non-Profit, Children, and Youth
- Headquarters: Kathmandu
- President: Sagar Aryal Nepal
- Website: www.sanosansar.org

Sano Sansar Initiative is a global youth-led non-profit organization and a platform for children and youth which was founded in February 2006 by Sagar Aryal in Nepal, to promote environment conservation, advocate children and youth on climate change, sustainable development, Rural Health and Education in the poverty prone 21st Century.

== Background ==
The founder of Sano Sansar Initiative was 10 years old when all this began. With encouragement from friends, family and his school, Sano Sansar Initiative soon became one of the active children led non-profit initiative for children and youth in Nepal. Originally, Sano Sansar Initiative was known as Sano Sansar Readers' Club, whose main aim was to deliver quality education to every child and support children and youth for better education through different aspects of the life. However, growing network of children and youth made the organization a non-profit initiative.

Some of the remarkable events of Sano Sansar Initiative are Little Doctors' Program (an advocacy program which allowed children, come together to discuss and learn about First Aid, Ayurvedic medicine and primary health issues) organized in February/March 2008, where president of Nepal Dr. Ram Baran Yadav invited the participants for inauguration in his presidential office.

Alongside this, The Education support program of Sano Sansar Initiative has been a successful program which has been able to support schools in rural places including Humla, remote North west corner of Nepal with educational materials to create an education resource centre in community school for students and play an important role in promoting right to education in rural Nepal.

Since 2013, Sano Sansar Initiative started a youth leadership program relating debating, Through Kathmandu Debates Sano Sansar Initiative introduced the Karl Popper Debating Championship Format in the general public for the first time in Nepal. Moreover, the Debate Educational Tracks, before the debate tournament has encouraged students and high school youth towards positive attitude towards debating. Recently, this organization has organised environmental song competition for the first time in Nepal. About 30 high schools and independent groups participated in this event. This program has contributed a lot in the long-term goal of creating a sustainable lifestyles through the means of song that is approachable to all people in the country.

Sano Sansar Initiative has spread in several countries of Asia, Europe and America through its partners and focal persons.

Sano Sansar Initiative is accredited in the United Nations Civil Society network, United Nations Global Compact and United Nations Environment Programme.
