= United Nations Major Group for Children and Youth =

UN Major Group for Children and Youth
- Founded: 1992
- Headquarters: Global
- Official language: All 6 of the official languages of the United Nations
- Website: https://unmgcy.org/

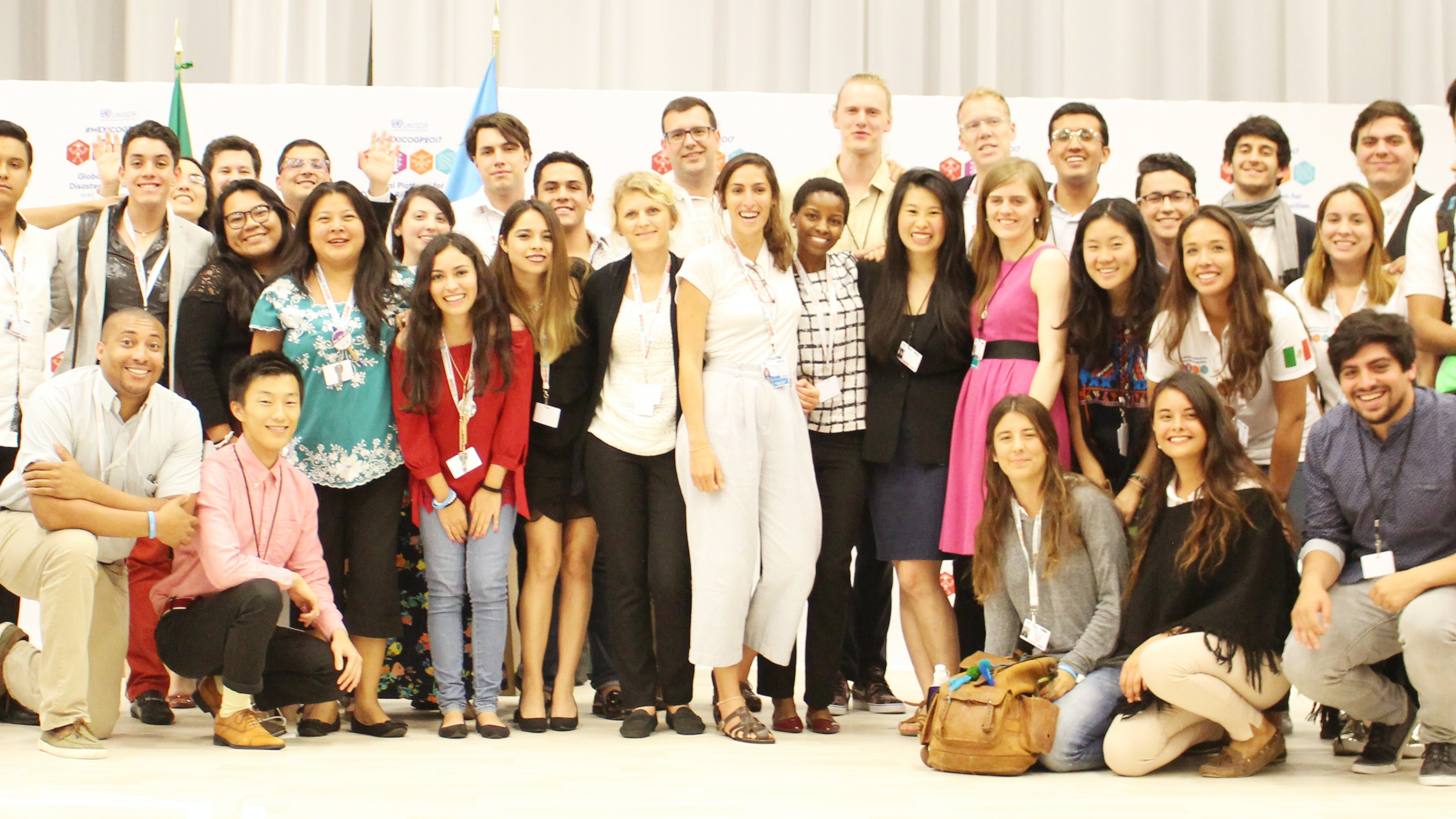
Members of the UN MGCY at the Global Platform for Disaster Risk Reduction 2017.

Established in 1992, the Major Group for Children and Youth (UN MGCY) is the United Nations General Assembly mandated, official, formal and self-organised space for children and youth to contribute to and engage in certain intergovernmental and allied policy processes at the United Nations.

== Role and areas of work ==
The MGCY acts as a bridge between young people and the UN system in order to ensure their right to meaningful participation. It does so by engaging formal and informal communities of young people, in the form of child-led, youth-led, and child-and-youth-serving federations, unions, organisations, associations, councils, networks, clubs, movements, mechanisms, structures and other entities, as well as their members and individuals in the Design, Implementation, Monitoring, and Follow-Up & Review of sustainable development policies at all levels.

In order to effectively and meaningfully engage in the UN, the MGCY facilitates and conducts a number of online and offline activities in the following areas- Policy & Advocacy, Capacity Building, Youth Action, and Knowledge .

=== Policy & Advocacy ===
The MGCY seeks to:

(a) Facilitate the collective and meaningful participation of young people in official and formal avenues of policy design, implementation, monitoring, follow-up and review at all levels. These include, but are not limited to: intergovernmental deliberations (negotiations, reviews and reporting), substantive deliberations, briefings, special fora, UN reports and UN system-wide policy.

(b) Advise entities in the UN system's engagement and thematic architecture across the scope of their activities on policy and substantive matters related to youth priorities and processes of meaningful engagement.

(c) Facilitate the participation of young people in existing stakeholder structures, partnerships, platforms and mechanisms in the UN system and build interlinkages among key stakeholders active in the work of relevant processes.

=== Capacity Building ===
The MGCY seeks to:

(a) Facilitate capacity building processes and activities for young people aimed at enhancing understanding, knowledge and skills in relation to sustainable development, meaningful engagement, the UN system and its various technical and political processes and organs.

=== Youth Action ===
The MGCY seeks to:

(a) Provide young people with a platform that encourages them to lead, join, showcase and share innovative and effective actions aimed at addressing the needs of all people and planet.

(b) Use youth-led initiatives to identify best practices, map sample activities across thematic and regional contexts and exemplify how youth actions contribute to the implementation, follow-up and review of targets, indicators, and deliverables across various sustainable development frameworks.

=== Knowledge ===
The MGCY seeks to:

(a) Provide young people a platform for dialogue to create an evidence base for best practices in design, implementation, monitoring, follow-up and review of sustainable development frameworks and affiliated processes. This includes the assessment of existing knowledge, the generation of new knowledge, the identification of emerging issues and effective use and dissemination of knowledge to inform policy processes. It should include inputs from formal, informal, traditional and indigenous knowledge streams.

== Membership ==
Membership in MGCY is facilitated through an open process. Any formal or informal child-led, youth-led and child-and-youth-serving entities, as well as their members and individuals, may join.

All members of the UN MGCY must, first and foremost:

- AGREE to adhere to the Process and Procedures of the MGCY;
- AGREE with the principles of the UN Charter;
- AGREE with the values and principles of the MGCY as expressed in its vision - “the collective principles of solidarity, justice, equity, inclusion, human rights and the integrity of the planet”.

The membership is divided between the following categories:

- Any youth-led or child-led entity that can sign up to the MGCY online or in person that is representative of the interests of children and/or youth, and has a policymaking body controlled by people 30 years old or under;
- Any child-or-youth serving entity that can sign up to the MGCY online or in person that works with children and/or youth but doesn't have a policymaking body controlled by individuals 30 years old or under.
- Any individual not part of one of the above-mentioned categories, may join the MGCY through becoming a member MGCY's legal entity called Children Youth International and abide to its Rules of Procedure and Code of Conduct.
- Once an eligible entity or individual (using the CYI channel) fills in the form, the coordination team processes the input and admits them as members. These entities that are members (not having a policymaking body controlled by people 30 years old or under) may not stand or vote in elections of the Organising Partners, Global Focal Points, or other mandated positions, apart from Children’s Focal Point.

== History ==
The Major Group system was created following the 1992 United Nations Conference on Environment and Development (UNCED), held in Rio de Janeiro, Brazil, also referred to as the Earth Summit. Through Section III of Agenda 21, one of the Earth Summit's outcome documents, the world's national governments formally recognized the role of all social groups in working towards sustainable development. To implement this, nine Major Groups were established to organize and channel inputs into intergovernmental processes established at the Summit. These include:

- Women
- Children and Youth
- Indigenous Peoples
- Non-Governmental Organizations
- Local Authorities
- Workers and Trade Unions
- Business and Industry
- Scientific and Technological Community
- Farmers

Two decades after the Earth Summit, the importance of effectively engaging these nine sectors of society was reaffirmed by the Rio+20 Conference. Its outcome document "The Future We Want" highlights the role that Major Groups can play in pursuing sustainable societies for future generations. In addition, governments invited other stakeholders to participate in UN processes related to sustainable development, which can be done through close collaboration with the Major Groups. These include:

- Local communities
- Volunteer groups
- Foundations
- Migrants and families
- Older persons
- Persons with disabilities

The Major Group for Children and Youth initially provided input into a single process: The Commission on Sustainable Development (CSD). The CSD was mandated to monitor the implementation of goals and resolutions adopted the Earth Summit, and functioned as a commission of the United Nations Economic and Social Council. From 1992 until 2012, the Commission on Sustainable Development met annually to discuss and evaluate progress towards the objectives established at the Earth Summit.

In 2012, following the United Nations Conference on Sustainable Development, the Commission on Sustainable Development was dissolved and its mandate transferred to the High Level Political Forum, along with the Major Group system of stakeholder participation. In light of the growing importance of sustainable development within the international system, Major Groups have been called upon by the United Nations General Assembly through various resolutions to participate in a growing number of additional processes.

Today, the Major Group for Children and Group is involved in over 20 engaged avenues in the United Nations. Additionally, the UN MGCY is recognized as a central player not only in intergovernmental negotiations, but also in the work of the UN in youth development. With the establishment of the Inter-Agency Network on Youth Development(IANYD) Office of the Secretary-General’s Envoy on Youth (OSGEY) and the expansion of the scope of the UN's focus on young people, the MGCY has positioned itself as a key partner in the UN's efforts in this area.

== Governance ==
In addition to the governance requirements of mandated position (all of which are either elected or peer selected) that are clearly outlined in the UN MGCY Process and Procedures, the MGCY has obligations towards the UN system, some of which are enshrined in resolutions of international soft law. The MGCY is required to submit an annual Governance Reports to UN DESA-DSD, and as per paragraph 89 of the 2030 Agenda an annual report to the HLPF (High Level Political Forum) under the auspices of ECOSOC (Economic and Social Council) and General Assembly .

== Processes ==
The current range of formal engagement avenues within the UN include, but are not limited to, intergovernmental processes, policy processes, coordination mechanisms, partnerships, and UN entity specific engagement at all levels. Each UN process/avenue or cluster of UN processes/avenues have a corresponding working group.

=== Intergovernmental Avenues ===
- Agenda 21 Follow Up
- The High-Level Political Forum on Sustainable Development (HLPF) and Regional Sustainable Development Forums (RSDF);
- The 2030 Agenda for Sustainable Development Process (2030 Agenda):
  - Commission on Food Security (as it relates to Sustainable Development Goals)
  - World Health Assembly (WHA) / Framework Convention on Tobacco Control / NCD Global Action Plan (as it relates to SDG 3);
  - Commission on the Status of Women (CSW) (as it relates to SDG 5);
- Sendai Framework for Disaster Risk Reduction (SFDRR) and follow-up - Regional and Global Plakorm for DRR, UNISDR Science and Technology Partnership;
- New Urban Agenda and follow-up - World Urban Forum, Habitat Governing Council and SDG 11;
- 10 Year Frameworks of Program for Sustainable Consumption and Production (10YFP for SCP) and follow-up and SDG 12;
- United Nations Framework Convention for Climate Change (UNFCCC) and SDG 13;
- The United Nations Conference to Support the Implementation of Sustainable Development Goal 14 (The Ocean Conference);
- United Nations Forum on Forests (UNFF) and SDG 15;
- Convention to Combat Desertification (CCD) and SDG 15;
- Convention on Biological Diversity (CBD) and SDG 15;
- SIDSs Accelerated Modalities for Action (S.A.M.O.A. Pathway) and Small Island Developing States (SIDS);
- Financing for Development (FfD) and FfD Follow-Up Forum;
- ECOSOC Humanitarian Affairs Segment (HAS);
- Global Compact for Migration (GCM);
- United Nations Conference on Trade and Development (UNCTAD);
- Commission on Science and Technology for (CSTD);
- Human Rights Council;
- Peace and Security.

=== Policy Processes ===
- Agenda for Humanity- Compact for Young People in Humanitarian Action;
- President of the General Assembly Dialogues and Events (PGA Dialogues);
- Ad Hoc Thematic High-Level Meetings of the General Assembly;
- Ad Hoc processes facilitated by the UN Department of Economic and Social Affairs, Division for Sustainable Development and other UN entities.

=== Youth Development and Youth Policy Avenues ===
- Inter-Agency Network on Youth Development [hereinaqer IANYD];
- Office of the Secretary-General's Envoy on Youth (OSGEY);
- Department of Social Policy and Development (UN DESA/DSPD):
- ECOSOC Youth Forum;

=== Multi-stakeholder Processes ===
- Major Groups and other Stakeholders HLPF Coordination Mechanism (CM);
- Sustainable Energy for All (as it relates to SDG 7);
- World Water Forum (as it relates to SDG 6);
- Technology Facilitation Mechanism (TFM);
- Global Alliance for Urban Crises (GAUC);
- Internet Governance Forum (IGF);
- Global Sustainable Development Report (GSDR).

The different external working groups of the MGCY correspond to the different formal UN processes that we are mandated to engage in. MGCY facilitates the participation of young people through the circle of policy design, implementation, monitoring, follow up and review. For each activity a different set of tools is used ranging from consultations to advocacy to action plans and formal monitoring.

- High Level Political Forum (HLPF): the HLPF working group is a successor of the MGCY Institutional Framework for Sustainable Development (IFSD) task force from Rio+20. It provides follow up and review of sustainable development implementation across several UN frameworks, and addresses new and emerging sustainable development challenges. HLPF began in 2013 and meets annually in New York City during June and July.
- Post-2015 and Sustainable Development Policy: the Post-2015 working group is a successor to the MGCY Green Economy Task force during the Rio+20 process. The Sustainable Development Goals negotiations lasted from March 2013 to July 2014, followed by further negotiations as part of the Post 2015 Process from January to July 2015. Transforming our world: the 2030 Agenda for Sustainable Development2 was adopted by UN member states in September 2015.
- Sustainable Consumption & Production (SCP): MGCY involvement in 10 Year Framework for Programmes on Sustainable Consumption and Production began in 2013 when the framework was established. In September 2014, the Progress Report on the 10 Year Framework of Programmes was released. Currently SCP prioritization is mainstreamed through the Sustainable Development Goals, Goal 12.
- Small Island Developing States (SIDS): SIDS was first formally recognized by the international community at the UN Conference on Environment and Development (UNCED) in 1992. In 2013, MGCY SIDS preparation began for the Third International Conferences on Small Islands Developing States and the process culminated in September 2014 with the SAMOA Pathway for SIDS.
- Disaster Risk Reduction (DRR): DRR aims to reduce the damage caused by natural and human induced hazards, as well as related environmental, technological, and biological risks through an ethic of prevention. The intergovernmental negotiation process for the Sendai Framework for Disaster Risk Reduction (the successor of the Hyogo Framework) started in April 2014. The process culminated at the Third UN World Conference on Disaster Risk Reduction that took place in Sendai, Japan from March 14–18, 2015. Currently, DRR is active in indicator review and furthering initiatives at the science policy interface and preparing for the Global Platform for Disaster Risk Reduction: From Commitment to Action which will take place from 22–26 May 2017: Cancun, Mexico
- Sustainable Urban Development and Housing (Habitat III): The intergovernmental negotiations and multi-stakeholder process for Habitat III began in 2014. Habitat III culminated at the United Nations Conference on Housing and Sustainable Urban Development, which took place in Quito, Ecuador from 17–20 October 2016. It offered Member States and Major Stakeholders an opportunity to discuss the New Urban Agenda focusing on policies and strategies to effectively harness the power and forces behind urbanization.
- World Humanitarian Summit (WHS): MGCY's formal engagement in the WHS process began in 2014. WHS was an initiative of former UN Secretary-General Ban Ki-moon, and took place in Istanbul, Turkey from May 23–24, 2016. It offered governments, humanitarian organizations, people affected by humanitarian crises, and private sector partners the opportunity to propose solutions to the most pressing humanitarian challenges as well as set an agenda to keep humanitarian action fit for the future.
- Finance for Sustainable Development (FfD): MGCY became engaged in the Intergovernmental Committee of Experts on Sustainable Development Financing, an outcome of Rio+20, in 2013. Engagement was further expanded through the CSO FfD Group and the Addis Coordination Group in 2014. The agenda setting phase of the process ended in July 2015 with the Addis Ababa Action Agenda.
