= Civil Society Leadership Institute =

Nonprofit pro-grassroots democracy activist training center

The Civil Society Leadership Institute (CSLI) is a not-for-profit training center founded in February 2007 as a civic education initiative of FIBRAS/Movimiento por Nicaragua—one of the largest pro-democracy movements in Central America. Its founding-director is Félix Maradiaga who is also a Young Global Leader (2009–2013) by the World Economic Forum and a Yale World Fellow (2008) by Yale University.

Its mission is twofold: to foster transformational leadership based on the ideas of liberty and democracy and to educate grassroots activists about the fundamentals and importance of non-violent social change.

To accomplish this mission, the Institute identifies recruits and trains grassroots democracy activists in Nicaragua. CSLI alumni embark upon a meaningful participation in the development of their communities.

CSLI signature academic programs—taught in conjunction with Universidad Americana based in Managua—help participants reflect on key concepts such as open society, adaptive leadership and the politics of non-violent action. In March 2007 CSLI became the first college-accredited leadership institute in Central America.

In June 2018, the regime of Daniel Ortega accused Félix Maradiaga of being the “intellectual author” behind an alleged coup attempt, initiating a politically motivated trial against him. International organizations, including the OAS and the UN, condemned these charges as baseless. That same year, the regime launched a systematic crackdown on civil society, arbitrarily shutting down thousands of NGOs it deemed a “threat to national sovereignty.” By 2022, over 1,500 organizations had been forcibly closed, including FIBRAS, the legal entity under which the Civil Society Leadership Institute (CSLI) operated. Despite this repression, in 2023, Maradiaga continued his work in civic education and nonviolent resistance, launching the World Liberty Congress Academy (WLC Academy)—a global training platform dedicated to equipping activists with strategies to counter authoritarianism. As part of the World Liberty Congress, the Academy fosters collaboration among democratic movements worldwide.
