= Go Grrrls =

Intervention curriculum for adolescent girls

Workbook cover

Go Grrrls is a gender-specific intervention curriculum for early adolescent girls that tries to promote a positive transition to adulthood. It is a social skills building and psychoeducational program administered in a group setting—targeted towards girls in their early teens. When compared to a control group using a self-reported evaluation, the program has shown a positive effect on girls' self-efficacy, body image and assertiveness. A pilot program was launched in 1995 and a final version was published in 1999. It is administered by a team of two or more co-facilitators. The program was designed by Craig LeCroy and Janice Daley. LeCroy also published an experimental evaluation of the program.

== Program design ==
The program is partitioned into several sessions of 30-60 minutes length. They are administered over a dozen weeks and focused on six topics: (Note: Earlier versions were administered in shorter periods of time.)

1. "Being a girl": introduction and evaluation, identifying gender roles and challenging societal pressures.
2. Positive body image and mindset: activities to boost self-image; understanding the effects of self-criticism, depression and eating disorders.
3. Making and keeping friends: social and life skills, independent critical thinking and developing satisfactory peer relationships.
4. When it all seems like too much: teach girls when to seek help and how to find resources for help.
5. Let’s talk about sex: basics of reproduction, sexuality and sexually transmitted diseases, how to refuse unwanted advances, and the effects of drugs and alcohol.
6. "Planning for the future": teach girls to make goals and work to achieve them.

== Criticism ==
The program has been criticized for lacking "the capacity to measure prevention." According to William Epstein, the program is also unlikely to make an impression on girls because of the didactic nature of its curriculum. He referred to the evaluation done by the LeCroy in 2004 as a "poorly designed study." confirming the need for a more authoritative evaluation.
