= Forum for Young Canadians =

Forum for Young Canadians is a non-partisan program for youth aged 15–19 founded by The Foundation for the Study of Processes of Government in Canada in Ottawa, Ontario. In March 1976 the first sessions of Forum were launched. The Forum for Young Canadians provides students with an opportunity to learn more about the importance of public affairs and how they can proactively be a voice in helping others understand Canadian politics in relation to the world around them.

== Program details ==
Forum runs for three sessions during February and March of each year. Each session is a week long experience which includes various behind the scenes activities in Canada's capital city including:

- Senate and House of Commons experiences
- Meeting various political leaders such as Members of Parliament, and Senators
- Participate in role-play based simulations such as National Election, International Trade and Ministerial Cabinet

The learning program begins before the students arrive at Forum for the week long program. Students are encouraged to learn about current affairs that interest them in order to bring their ideas, opinions and insights to share with other students. The learning program continues after they depart from Ottawa, giving students an opportunity to further connect with their own community based on what they have learned, creating a learning environment for others around them.

Forum encourages students to proactively seek out sponsors or fund-raise to aid them in covering the costs of the program. The fees cover meals for the entire week, accommodations and transportation. Bursaries are also available.

Forum provides an opportunity for high school and Cégep students who want to further their leadership skills, learn about the political, social and cultural issues impacting their country and communities and create friendships with other young, passionate students throughout Canada.

== See also ==
- Canadian House of Commons Page Program
- Canadian Senate Page Program
