= Interagency Working Group on Youth Programs =

The Interagency Working Group on Youth Programs (IWGYP, or Working Group) is a group within the executive branch of the U.S. government, and is responsible for promoting healthy outcomes for all youth, including disconnected youth and youth who are at-risk. The Working Group also engages with national, state, local and tribal agencies and organizations, schools, and faith-based and community organizations that serve youth.

Membership of the Working Group includes staff from 18 federal departments and agencies that support programs and services that target youth. The Working Group was formally established by Executive Order 13459, Improving the Coordination and Effectiveness of Youth Programs, on February 7, 2008.

The Working Group has developed a Federal Interagency Website on Youth: Youth.gov. This website houses federally developed tools and resources, as well as resources submitted by those working in the field, to help youth-serving organizations and community partnerships as they work to promote positive youth outcomes.

== Overview ==
The IWGYP is responsible for promoting achievement of positive outcomes for youth through the following key activities:

- Create and Support Youth.gov - This federal website provides interactive tools and other resources to help youth-serving organizations and community partnerships plan, implement, and participate in effective programs for youth.
- Create and Support YE4C.gov - This site is the home of the IWGYP’s online youth engagement efforts. YE4C helps young people between the ages of 16 and 24 engage in change on personal, community, and national levels.
- Identify and Disseminate Promising and Effective Strategies - The IWGYP identifies strategies, tools, and resources accessible through Youth.gov that will help promote effective community-based efforts addressing youth risk and protective factors. The Program Directory, a searchable database on Youth.gov, provides visitors with information about such efforts. Communities can determine whether replicating these strategies will meet their needs.
- Promote Enhanced Collaboration – The IWGYP identifies and engages key government, private, and nonprofit organizations that can play a role in improving the coordination and effectiveness of programs serving and appealing to youth. Entities include faith-based and other organizations, community coalitions and partnerships, businesses, volunteers, and other key constituencies. These partnerships and collaborations provide mechanisms to obtain feedback on how federal initiatives are translated at the local level; keep organizations informed about federal funding opportunities; and provide the IWGYP with communication mechanisms to reach regional, state, and local programs.

In addition, the IWGYP is responsible for preparing a strategic plan for federal youth policy (Omnibus Appropriations Act, 2009 Committee Print of the House Committee on Appropriations on H.R. 1105/Public Law 111-8, Division F). The current draft plan, Pathways for Youth: Draft Strategic Plan for Federal Collaboration, serves as a strengths-based vision for youth that acknowledges the importance of pathways to opportunity for youth that include meaningful connections and safe, healthy, and stable places to live, learn, and work.

The plan includes three main goals, with corresponding objectives, as well as cross-cutting initiatives that will move the plan forward. The three goals of Pathways for Youth are to:

- Promote coordinated strategies to improve youth outcomes;
- Promote the use of evidence-based and innovative strategies at the federal, state, local, and tribal levels; and
- Promote youth engagement and partnerships to strengthen programs and benefit youth.

== Membership ==
Membership of the Interagency Working Group on Youth Programs includes staff from twelve Federal agencies that support programs and services that target youth:

- U.S. Department of Agriculture;
- U.S. Department of Commerce;
- U.S. Department of Defense;
- U.S. Department of Education;
- U.S. Department of Health and Human Services (Chair);
- U.S. Department of Homeland Security;
- U.S. Department of Housing and Urban Development;
- U.S. Department of Justice (Vice-Chair);
- U.S. Department of Labor;
- U.S. Department of State;
- U.S. Department of the Interior;
- U.S. Department of Transportation;
- U.S. Environmental Protection Agency;
- U.S. Social Security Administration;
- U.S. Small Business Administration;
- The Corporation for National and Community Service; and
- National Science Foundation;
- The Office of National Drug Control Policy.

The Interagency Working Group on Youth Programs was formally established by Executive Order 13459, Improving the Coordination and Effectiveness of Youth Programs, on February 7, 2008.

== A Federal Website on Youth: Youth.gov ==
The Interagency Working Group on Youth Programs has developed a Federal Interagency Website on Youth (Youth.gov), which houses federally developed tools and resources, as well as resources submitted by those working in the field, to help youth-serving organizations and community partnerships. Youth.gov seeks to benefit federal agencies, youth service providers, and the youth-serving community. The tools and resources available on the website include resources to assist communities and others with:

- Key elements of effective partnerships, including strategies for engaging youth;
- Helpful community assessment tools;
- Mapping tools that generate maps of local and federal youth programs;
- Searchable database of evidence-based programs to address risk and protective factors in youth;
- High-quality federal publications and web links on youth issues; and
- Youth Topics, which present information on cross-cutting youth topics, federal programs related to this topic that support youth, and shortcuts to maps to find federal programs that address these youth topics.

Topics include:

- Preventing youth violence;
- Mentoring;
- Transition-age youth;
- Positive youth development;
- Afterschool programs;
- Children of incarcerated parents;
- Youth mental health;
- Preventing gang involvement;
- Youth disaster preparedness;
- Runaway and homeless youth;
- Substance abuse;
- LGBT youth;
- Reconnecting youth;
- Teen pregnancy prevention;
- Juvenile justice;
- Youth employment;
- Teen driver safety;
- Teen dating violence;
- Civic engagement;
- Service learning; and
- Bullying.

== Promoting High Standards for Assessing Program Results ==
The Working Group seeks to develop additional strategies, tools, and resources accessible through the Youth.gov that can help promote effective community-based efforts that address youth risk and protective factors.

The Youth.gov Program Directory is a searchable database that provides users with information about evidence-based programs whose purpose is to prevent and/or reduce problem behaviors in young people (under age 18). Communities can use this tool to determine whether replicating these strategies will meet local needs.

Two sets of programs are included:

1. The Teen Pregnancy Prevention program directory. Under a contract with the Department of Health and Human Services (HHS), Mathematica Policy Research conducted an independent systematic review of the evidence base for programs to prevent teen pregnancy, sexually transmitted infections, and/or sexual risk behaviors.

This review defined the criteria for the quality of an evaluation study and the strength of evidence for a particular intervention. Based on these criteria, HHS has defined a set of rigorous standards an evaluation must meet in order to be considered an evidence-based program. The review is being updated on an ongoing basis.

2. The Substance Abuse, Violence, and Other Risk Behavior program directory. . Through a partnership with the U.S. Department of Justice, programs are assessed by expert study reviewers from the Office of Juvenile Justice and Delinquency Prevention’s (OJJDP’s) Model Programs Guide (MPG), using www.CrimeSolutions.gov program review process, scoring instrument, and evidence standards. The MPG is an easy-to-use program database established to assist practitioners, policymakers, and communities in identifying and implementing programs that can make a difference in the lives of children and families. Information includes child victimization, substance abuse, youth violence, mental health and trauma, and gang activity.

In addition to the searchable Program Directory, the Youth.gov site also maintains the website A Guide to Evidence and Innovation, which aims to help organizations select, implement, monitor, and evaluate evidence-based programs and strategies. The website includes information that can assist organizations in identifying what they are hoping to address through implementation, assessing their readiness and capacity, finding programs that meet their needs, adapting programs while maintaining fidelity, and conducting ongoing evaluation and monitoring. Users can also learn about federal efforts around evidence and the evidence base to support policies and programs as well as watch videos featuring experts in the field that can guide their program implementation efforts.

== Promoting Collaboration at the Federal, State, and Local Level ==
The IWGYP has developed a series of collaboration profiles to promote enhanced collaboration at the federal, state, and local levels. The profiles provide real-world examples of the ways that different organizations work together to improve outcomes for youth. Each collaboration is unique in their purpose, accomplishments, how they structure their work, the challenges that they face, and the types of organizations that are involved.

Featured collaboration profiles include:

- Improving Outcomes for Youth: Steps Toward Federal Collaboration
- DOI Collaborates to Engage Youth in the America’s Natural and Cultural Heritage
- DOL and HHS Work Together to Address Youth Substance Use
- Promise Neighborhoods: A Federal and Local Level Collaborative Effort
- USDA and the Military Support Youth through Positive Youth Development
- Providing Unbiased Services for LGBTQ Youth Project
- National Forum on Youth Violence Prevention
- Involving Youth at the National Youth in Transition Database (NYTD) Technical Assistance Meeting
- Navicate: Supporting Youth as They Transition from High School to Careers or Postsecondary Education
- Atlanta Housing Authority: Forging Partnerships that Provide Supportive Services to Customers
- Partnership for Results
- National Organizations for Youth Safety (NOYS)
- AmeriCorps NCCC and the National Guard Youth ChalleNGe Program
- Project U-Turn: Addressing Philadelphia’s Dropout Crisis

== Identifying and Promoting Initiatives that Merit Interagency Collaboration ==
The IWGYP has begun to identify other promising Federal initiatives with which to engage, including the following agencies and groups:

- Federal Mentoring Council, which seeks to coordinate mentoring programs across the Federal government;
- Coordinating Council on Juvenile Justice and Delinquency Prevention, which coordinates Federal programs related to juvenile delinquency prevention, detention or care for unaccompanied juveniles, and missing and exploited children;
- Interagency Coordinating Committee on the Prevention of Underage Drinking, which works to reduce and prevent underage drinking; and
- Teen Dating Violence Federal Workgroup, which seeks to coordinate efforts to support healthy relationships and reduce dating violence among teens.

== Identifying Partners and Developing Partnerships ==
The Working Group is charged with identifying and engaging key government and private or nonprofit organizations that can play a role in improving the coordination and effectiveness of programs serving and engaging youth, such as faith-based and other organizations, community coalitions and partnerships, businesses, volunteers and other key constituencies.

== See also ==
- Working group
- Youth program
