= Catch21 =

Catch21 is a charitable production company and internet based broadcaster which organises and stages shows all over the UK with the key aim of engaging young people with politics, the concept was initially devised by a group of current and former students of the University of Hull.

The organisation was set up as a company limited by Directors Guarantee in April 2005 under the management of five board members, although work had informally started in November 2004. The initial work done was in the form of "Student Question Time" shows around the country, this led to the blueprint of the company with all recordings also being made available via podcasts and vodcasts from the website.

Well known Members of Parliament who have taken part in Catch21 shows include: Prime Ministers Gordon Brown and Boris Johnson, Liberal Democrats Leaders Nick Clegg and Charles Kennedy, the former Home Secretaries, Alan Johnson and Charles Clarke, and former Chancellor of the Exchequer Alistair Darling.

In September 2010, Catch21 launched a brand new website. This was, in part, to promote the launch of a new series of videos: "Mpinions". These videos featured interviews with MPs who had been newly elected in the 2010 general election.

In recent years Catch21 has operated as a social enterprise, funding its charity work through the commercial operations of its Catch Creative and Catch Engagement arms. In 2013, the Charity moved to new offices in Tech City (Old Street) area of London where it continues making youth engagement videos such as the popular Voice of the Voiceless and Under Questioning series.
