= Independent Living Program =

The Independent Living Program is a United States Department of Veterans Affairs (VA) Vocational Rehabilitation and Employment (VR&E) program aimed at making sure that each eligible veteran is able to live independently to their maximum capacity. The program is commonly referred to as VA ILP. The program is a two-year program that can be extended up to 28 months. There is an enrollment cap of 2700 participants per year. VA ILP may include the following services:

- assistive technology specialized medical, health, and / or rehabilitation services
- services to address any personal and / or family adjustment issues
- independent living skills training connection with community-based support services
- individualized equipment to assist with possible employment, volunteer opportunities or to decrease social isolation
- animals to assist with coping or independent movement
- attendant care during the period of transition
- transportation when special arrangements are needed
- peer counseling
- training to improve awareness of rights and needs

== Who qualifies ==
In order to qualify for the ILP a veteran must meet the following criteria:

- Be eligible to enroll for VR&E services
- Have service-connected disabilities that inhibit the ability to pursue an employment goal
- Have a vocational rehabilitation counselor (VRC) determine that employment goals are not currently feasible and all of the following are true:
  - The veteran has a serious employment handicap
  - The veteran's disabilities prevent them from looking for or returning to work
  - The veteran is in need of services to live as independently as possible

Enrollment into ILP does NOT affect any benefits the veteran is receiving from VA or the Social Security Administration. Enrollment is limited to 2,700 eligible veterans annually.

== Process ==
Once the veteran has been identified as qualifying for the ILP, an evaluation of the veteran's independent living needs will be conducted. The VRC assigns a VA consultant to conduct an Assessment of Needs at the home of the veteran. The Assessment of Needs is used by the VRC to create an Individualized Independent Living Plan (IILP). Based on the amount required to fulfill the IILP, the IILP is either approved at the Local (up to $25,000), Regional ($25,000 to $75,000), or Central/D.C. (over $75,000) level. Upon approval, the plan is implemented.

== Individualized Independent Living Plan ==
The IILP is created by the VRC with input from the VA consultant. Care is taken to ensure the IILP is consistent with the principles and goals of the Veterans Affairs Administration. The philosophical framework for the IILP is composed of the following nine principles.

1. Enhance participation in activities of daily living (ADL)
2. Assist the veteran in participating to the maximum extent possible and desirable in family and community life
3. Provide the most effective services and assistive technology based on sound research evidence
4. Provide required holistic evaluation and services for all veterans who qualify
5. Develop rehabilitation plans that provide services to address all identified independent living needs
6. Consider the veteran's expressed interests and desires, but provide services based on objectively identified needs
7. Establish goals and measure/verify outcomes
8. Provide services that produce a sustaining influence that continues after rehabilitation services are completed
9. Explore the possibility of paid or volunteer employment, when feasible
