= Spirit of Enniskillen Trust =

Youth charity in Northern Ireland

The Spirit of Enniskillen Trust
- Founded: 1989
- Founder: Gordon Wilson
- Dissolved: 2013
- Type: NGO
- Registration no.: Charitable status granted by the Inland Revenue. Ref. No. XR15484
- Location: 97 Malone Avenue, Belfast, Northern Ireland
- Director: Michael Arlow

The Spirit of Enniskillen Trust was a youth-led charity based in Belfast which worked across Northern Ireland with young people from a wide variety of backgrounds to "encourage and support young people from different cultural traditions and experiences to learn from discussion, find areas of commonality as well as learn to "agree to disagree". At the same time, the trust helped to develop their capacity, skills and commitment to initiate similar positive dialogue with others"

The Charity ran for over 20 years and won The Guardian's UK Charity of the Year award in 2011. It was wound up in 2013 because of a growing and unsustainable deficit in the organisation's pension provision.

== History ==
Gordon Wilson
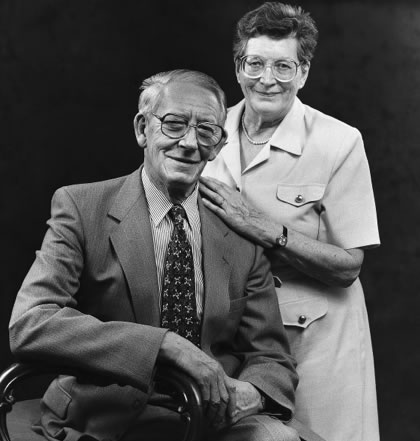
- Gordon Wilson with his wife Joan

The Trust was established in the aftermath of the Provisional Irish Republican Army (PIRA) bombing of the centotaph in Enniskillen on Remembrance Sunday, 8 November 1987, which killed 11 people. The atrocity could have provoked a wave of revenge attacks, but the Trust built itself on the words and deeds of Gordon Wilson, who lost his daughter Marie (aged 20) in the explosion. The BBC has described the bombing as a turning point in The Troubles, and an attack that shook the IRA "to its core". Pivotal to turning point was Wilson's reaction to the murder of his daughter Marie in an interview that he gave to the BBC only hours after her death. Wilson forgave the terrorists and said he would pray for them. He also begged that no-one took revenge for Marie's death and pleaded with Loyalists not to do so.

Despite his sadness at her death, Mr Wilson said in a BBC television interview: 'I bear no ill will. I bear no grudge. Dirty sort of talk is not going to bring her back to life. She was a great wee lassie. She loved her profession. She was a pet. She's dead. She's in heaven and we shall meet again. I will pray for these men tonight and every night.'

== Background ==
In 1989 the Spirit of Enniskillen Trust was founded to run international programme for young people. The Spirit of Enniskillen sought to engage the energy, idealism and commitment of young people into the building of a shared, fair and diverse society in Northern Ireland. "The idea was to encourage young people aged between sixteen and nineteen from Northern Ireland to travel outside the Province and to use their experience to help build community bridges at home"

In its latter years, the Trust operated three programmes:

- Explore – International exchange and leadership
- Future Voices – Promoting volunteering and participation
- Together – Supporting "Shared Education" in post–primary schools.
