= Millennium Kids =

Millennium Kids is a youth environmental organisation and registered charity founded in 1996 by four 12-year-olds. It developed after a group of Western Australian students attended the United Nations "Leave It To Us" environmental conference for children in the United Kingdom and subsequently organised their own environmental conference, "Kids Helping Kids". The organisation works with schools on environmental and sustainability education and has affiliates in Canada and South Africa.

== History ==
Millennium Kids was founded by four twelve-year-olds in 1996.

A small group of Western Australian students attended the United Nations ‘Leave It To Us’ environmental conference for children in the United Kingdom (UK). Upon their return, they decided to develop their own environmental conference, "Kids Helping Kids", with support of Perth Zoo, Department of Environment, Clean Up Australia, CALM and the City of South Perth. Following this, they founded Millennium Kids.

In 2000, they presented a series of "environmental challenges" to Environment Minister Cheryl Edwardes, who tabled them at Parliament.

In 2012, the Western Australia Headquarters was based in the Old Fremantle Prison. The group works with schools to arrange environmental and sustainability education, connecting pupils and teachers with local community groups.

In 2014, the group organised projects to clean up the Swan River.

== Organisation ==
Millennium Kids is a registered charity with affiliates in Canada and South Africa, and has collaborative links in Indonesia, China and Malaysia. The organization is run by children aged 10-25 years old. In 2014 the president was Rachael Cochrain.

Millennium Kids is directed by a Youth Board, with fifteen members aged between 10 and 25 years.

== Canada ==
In Canada, as a not-for-profit organisation, Millennium Kids facilitates environmental activities across Ontario (from Ottawa, Toronto, to Kitchener-Waterloo). A youth board is present in Ottawa and Kitchener-Waterloo, as well as a chapter starting up in 2006 through the school system in Toronto, Ontario. The youth board decides on what initiatives will be taken upon the year. Among the activities, the Car Free Festival are planned as initiatives in cooperation with other environmental/youth empowerment organisations that reside in the respective area of the initiative.
