= Palestinian Youth Association for Leadership and Rights Activation =

Palestianian youth education organization

Palestinian Youth Association for Leadership and Rights Activation الهيئة الفلسطينية للإعلام وتفعيل دور الشباب
- Founded: 1999; 27 years ago
- Type: Non-profit
- Purpose: Protecting and promoting children and young Palestinians’ rights through capacity building, advocacy campaigns, and policy change
- Region served: Palestinian territories
- Website: pyalara.org

The Palestinian Youth Association for Leadership and Rights Activation (PYALARA; Arabic: الهيئة الفلسطينية للإعلام وتفعيل دور الشباب) is a youth-oriented Palestinian communication and media non-governmental organization designed to provide a creative outlet for young Palestinians frustrated by the harsh conditions of the Israeli–Palestinian conflict.

Pyalara uses an open, two-way communication teaching system rather than the one-way pedagogic method favoured by most educational institutions to impart knowledge. Its students are taught to express themselves through written, oral, and media communications published in a monthly newspaper, The Youth Times and a weekly television program, Alli Sowtak (Speak Up).

The focus is on empowerment through learning about the rights of children and youth, civil and legal rights during the conflict, team-building, raising cultural awareness, protecting the environment and social activism. Students participate in journalism, counselling, and advocacy to overcome the marginalization and alienation of youth.

Pyalara works with UNICEF, the Palestinian Ministry of Education, Ministry of Information, the Ministry of Youth and Sports, Palestinian universities, colleges, schools and NGOs.

During the Covid-19 pandemic, the organization has also been working in partnership with DW Akademie to teach "media and information literacy (MIL)".
