= Children & Families of Iowa =

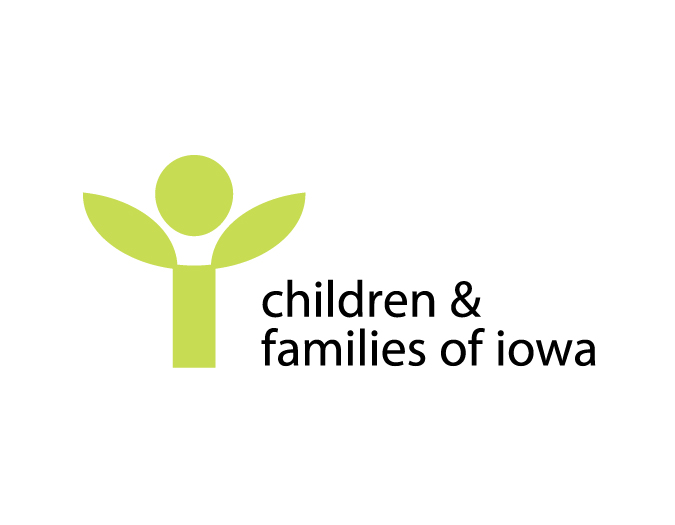
- The logo of CFI
- Founded: 1888
- Founder: Group
- Type: 501(c)(3) non-profit
- Tax ID no.: 42-1216316 (Foundation for Children & Families of Iowa), 42-0680416 (Children & Families of Iowa)
- Location: 1111 University Ave, Des Moines, IA 50314
- Services: Family support, mental healthcare
- Key people: Janice Lane Schroeder, CEO; Amy Stapp-Arpy, CDO; Melissa Pasker, CHRO
- Revenue: US$15,190,221 (2025)
- Website: Official website
- Formerly called: Iowa Educational Aid Society (1888–1894), Iowa Children’s Home Society (1894–1968), Iowa Children’s and Family Services (1968–1991)

Children & Families of Iowa (CFI) is a nonprofit organization serving at-risk children and families in Iowa. The organization was started in 1888.

Its Elevate youth-driven foster care program was started in the summer of 2005 in Des Moines, Iowa as a support group for fostered and adopted youth. Elevate's activities include training and empowering youth to advocate for themselves and others, educating legislators and other decision makers, developing partnerships to help youth successfully age out of foster care and encouraging others to open their homes to foster teens. Membership includes current and former foster youth, adoptees from the foster care system and the biological children of foster and adoptive parents. Foster care alumni, social workers, foster and adoptive parents and juvenile attorneys function as supports for the group. In 2014, CFI served over 25,600 people.

In 2026, former Program Director of CFI, Jodi Dyan Spargur-Tate, pleaded guilty to theft of non-profit funds; this became a federal case due to CFI being a recipient of federal funds. She is scheduled to be sentenced on August 25, 2026.

== See also ==
- Aging out
