= Working group =

Group of experts working together

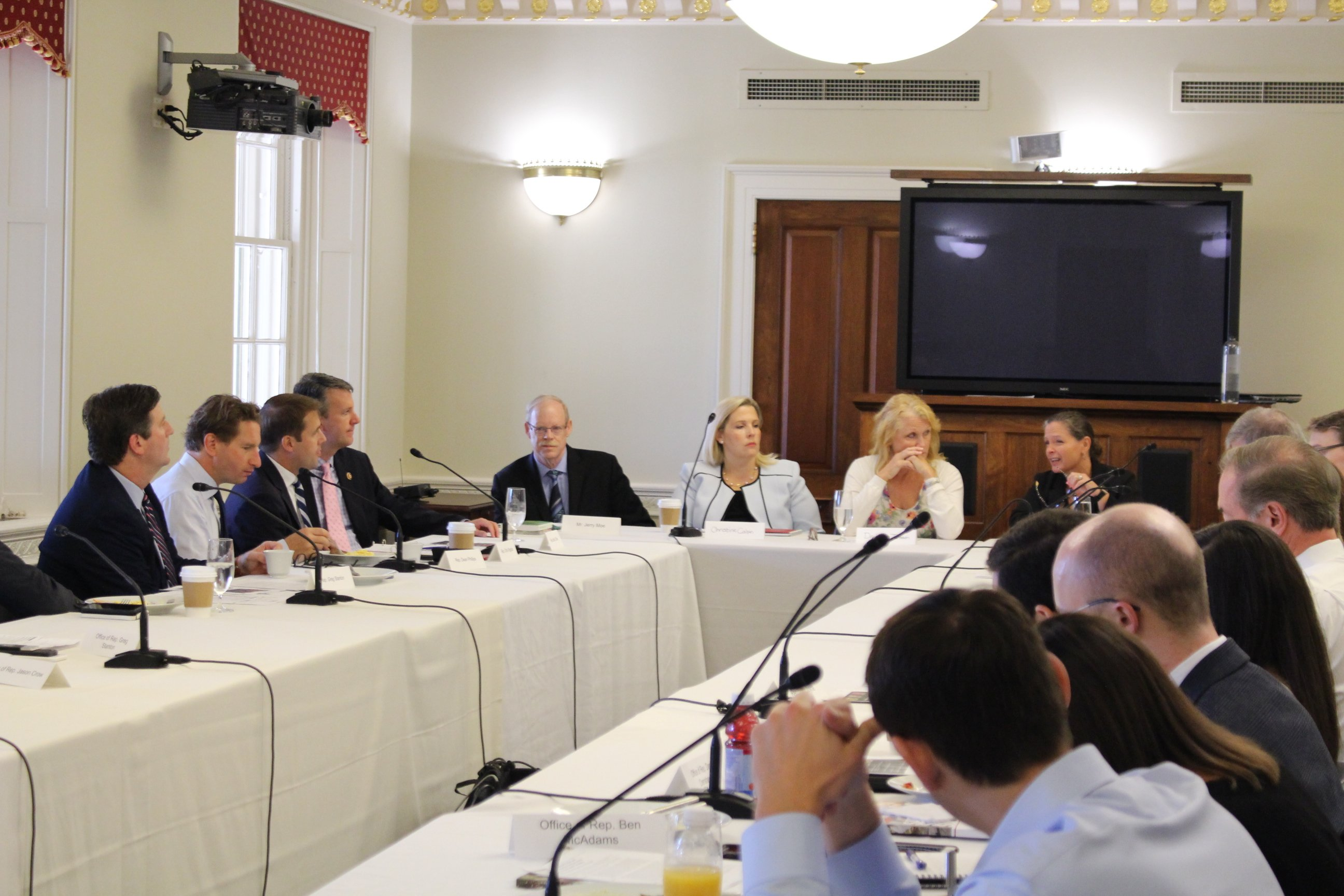
A U.S. House of Representatives working group on addiction (2019)

A working group is a group of experts working together to achieve specified goals. Such groups are domain-specific and focus on discussion or activity around a specific subject area. The term can sometimes refer to an interdisciplinary collaboration of researchers, often from more than one organization, working on new activities that would be difficult to sustain under traditional funding mechanisms (e.g., federal agencies). Working groups are variously also called task groups, workgroups, technical advisory groups, working parties, or task forces.

The lifespan of a working group can last anywhere between a few months and several years. Such groups have the tendency to develop a quasi-permanent existence when the assigned task is accomplished; hence the need to disband (or phase out) the working group when it has achieved its goal(s).

A working group's performance is made up of the individual results of all its individual members. A team's performance is made up of both individual results and collective results. In large organisations, working groups are prevalent, and the focus is always on individual goals, performance and accountabilities. Working group members do not take responsibility for results other than their own. On the other hand, teams require both individual and mutual accountability. There is more information sharing, more group discussions and debates to arrive at a group decision.

Examples of common goals for working groups include:

- creation of an informational document
- creation of a standard
- resolution of problems related to a system or network
- continuous improvement
- research

== Characteristics ==
The nature of the working group may depend on the group's raison d’être – which may be technical, artistic (specifically musical), or administrative in nature.

=== Administrative working groups ===
These working groups are established by decision makers at higher levels of the organization for the following purposes:

1. To elaborate, consolidate, and build on the consensus of the decision makers; and
2. To ensure (and improve) coordination among the various segments of the organization. A shared commitment to agreed common aims develops among the parties as they work together to clarify issues, formulate strategies, and develop action plans.

For example, the Interagency Working Group on Youth Programs is a group of twelve federal agencies within the executive branch of the U.S. government, and is responsible for promoting achievement of positive results for at-risk youth. This working group was formally established by Executive Order 13459, Improving the Coordination and Effectiveness of Youth Programs, on 7 February 2008.

Quality circles are an alternative to the dehumanizing concept of the division of labor, where workers or individuals are treated like robots. Quality circles can help enrich the lives of workers or students and aid in creating harmony and high performance. Typical topics are improving occupational safety and health, improving product design, and improvement in the workplace and manufacturing processes.

=== Musical working groups ===
Although any artisan or artist can benefit from being part of a working group, it is especially of great import for session players. Musicians face a variety of challenges that can impede the formation of musical working groups, such as touring and studio recording sessions. Such activities make it that much more difficult to concentrate on the developing the cohesiveness that is required to maintain a working group.

However, working groups have been shown to be rewarding to the stakeholders, as it fosters innovation. By working with the same people frequently, members become familiar with the répertoire of other members, which develops trust and encourages spontaneity.

Some of the more notable musical working groups include:

- Abdullah Ibrahim Trio;
- Alex von Schlippenbach Trio;
- Dave Holland (Trio, Quartet, or Quintet);
- Die Like A Dog Quartet;
- Gary Bartz Quartet;
- Vandermark 5; and
- William Parker Quartet (Trio/Quartet).

=== Technical working groups ===
In many technical organizations, for example Standards organizations, the groups that meet and make decisions are called "working groups". Examples include:

- IEC working groups
- IETF working groups (which are subordinate to Areas)
  - HTTP WG, original led by Dave Raggett
- IEEE-SA working groups
  - IEEE WG802.3, Ethernet Working Group
  - IEEE WG802.11, Wireless LAN Working Group
- ISO working groups (which are subordinate to an SC (subcommittee), subordinate to a TC (technical committee))
- International Conference on Harmonisation
- International Union of Pure and Applied Chemistry (IUPAC)
- International Astronomical Union
- W3C working groups
  - Device Description Working Group
  - SVG Working Group
- Bioethics Council
- Consultative Committee for Space Data Systems (CCSDS)
- European Cooperation for Space Standardization (ECSS)
- US National Institute of Justice (NIJ)

In some cases, like the Printer Working Group, an entire consortium uses the term "working group" for itself.

The rules for who can be a part of the working groups, and how a working group makes decisions, varies considerably between organizations.

== Mechanics ==
It is imperative for the participants to appreciate and understand that the working group is intended to be a forum for cooperation and participation. Participants represent the interests and views of stakeholders from disparate sectors of the community which happen to have a vested interest in the results of the WG. Therefore, maintaining and strengthening communication lines with all parties involved is essential (this responsibility cuts both ways – stakeholders are expected to share what information, knowledge and expertise they have on the issue).

Programmes developed should be evaluated by encouraging community input and support; this will ensure that such programmes meet the community's vision for its future. The WG should also regularly seek community feedback on their projects. Apropos questions to be asked during such meetings include:

- What were the objectives of the program?
- What were the results of the project?
- What effect did the results have on the identified problem?
- What unexpected results — desirable or otherwise — were observed?
- How were the results achieved? (Was it by the methods and techniques originally intended, or did these evolve with implementation?)
- Was there an effective use of community resources?
- Should our objective or methods be changed?

Depending on the lifespan of the WG, involved parties (at the very least) convene annually. However, such meetings may happen as often as once every semester or trimester.

The managers are constantly called upon to make decisions in order to solve problems. Decision making and problem solving are ongoing processes of evaluating situations or problems, considering alternatives, making choices, and following them up with the necessary actions and now with this managed to reach a continuous improvement.

== See also ==
- Leadership – Quality of an individual or group influencing or guiding others
- Action group
- Facilitation
- Facilitator – Person who helps a group understand common objectives & reach them
- Herrmann Brain Dominance Instrument – Type of cognitive style measurement and model
- Adhocracy – Organization type characterized by minimal structure
- Interdisciplinarity – Combination of two or more academic disciplines into one activity
- Workers' self-management – Form of organizational management
- Learned society – Social entity established to pursue a scholarly field or academic discipline
- Professional association – Typically nonprofit organization seeking to further a particular profession
- Scientific community – Network of interacting scientists
- Parliamentary system – Form of government
- Public participation – Inclusion of the people in the activities of any organization or project
- Skills management – Developing the skills employees need
- Syndicate – Social organisations of various types
- Teamwork – Collaborative effort of a team to achieve a common goal
