= Youth empowerment =

Process where young people are encouraged to take charge of their lives

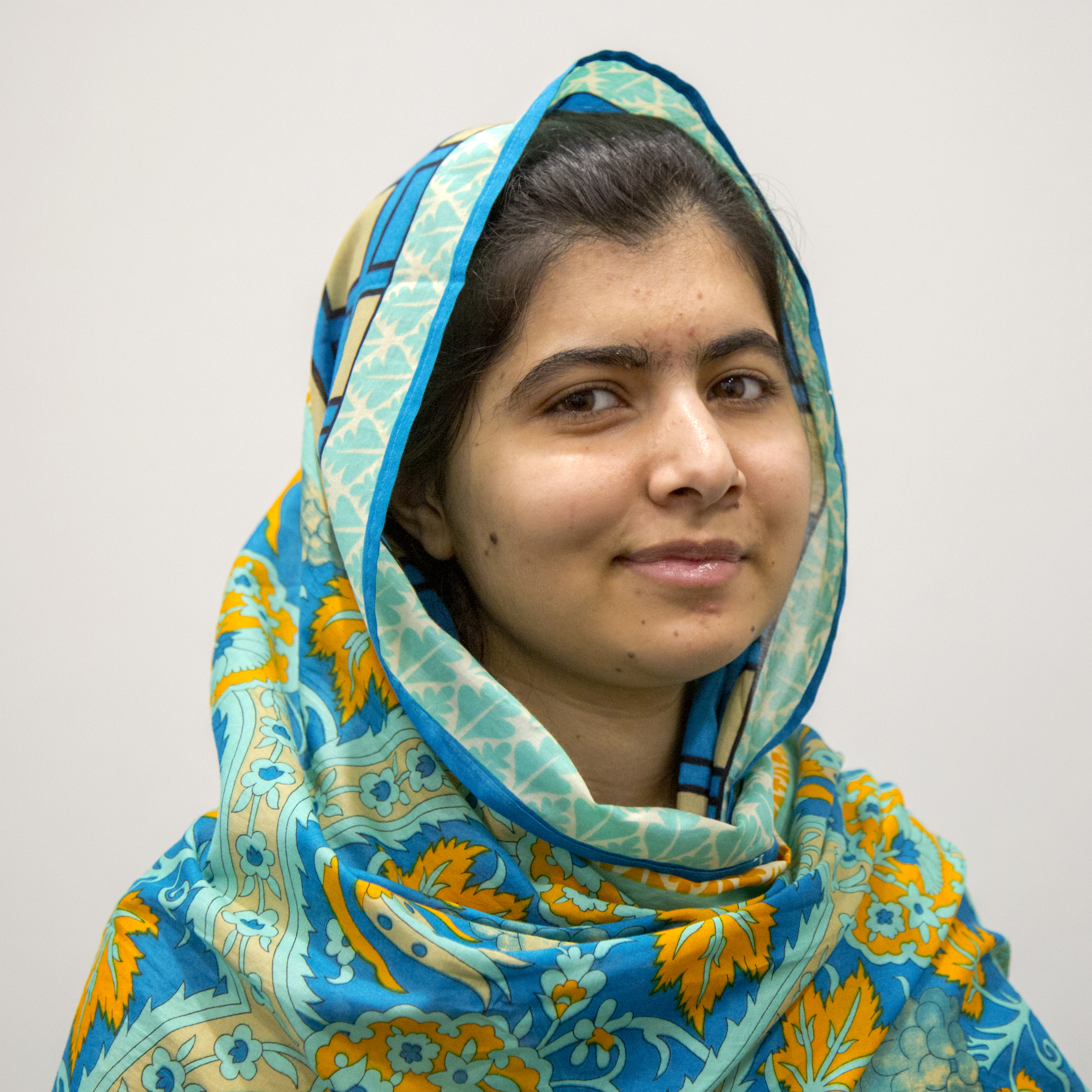
Malala Yousafzai, an activist for female education and the youngest Nobel Prize laureate.

Youth empowerment is a process where children and young people are encouraged to take charge of their lives. They do this by addressing their situation and then take action in order to improve their access to resources and transform their consciousness through their beliefs, values, and attitudes. Youth empowerment aims to improve quality of life. Youth empowerment is achieved through participation in youth empowerment programs. However scholars argue that children's rights implementation should go beyond learning about formal rights and procedures to give birth to a concrete experience of rights. There are numerous models that youth empowerment programs use that help youth achieve empowerment. A variety of youth empowerment initiatives are underway around the world. These programs can be through non-profit organizations, government organizations, schools or private organizations.

Youth empowerment is different from youth development because development is centered on developing individuals, while empowerment is focused on creating greater community change relies on the development of individual capacity.

Empowerment movements, including youth empowerment, originate, gain momentum, become viable, and become institutionalized. Youth empowerment is often addressed as a gateway to intergenerational equity, civic engagement and democracy building. Activities may focus on youth-led media, youth rights, youth councils, youth activism, youth involvement in community decision-making, and other methods.

== Elements of empowerment ==
=== Empowerment theory ===
Empowerment theory focuses on processes that enable participation; enhance control through shared decision making; and create opportunities to learn, practice, and increase skills. Empowerment theory suggests that engaging youth in pro-social, meaningful, and community-enhancing activities that the youth themselves define and control, helps youth gain vital skills, responsibilities, and confidence necessary to become productive and healthy adults.

=== Types of empowerment ===
Youth empowerment examines six interdependent dimensions: psychological, community, organizational, economic, social and cultural. Psychological empowerment enhances individual's consciousness, belief in self-efficacy, awareness and knowledge of problems and solutions and of how individuals can address problems that harm their quality of life. This dimension aims to create self-confidence and give youth the skills to acquire knowledge. Community empowerment also focuses on enhancing the community through leadership development, improving communication, and creating a network of support to mobilize the community to address concerns. Organizational empowerment aims to create a base of resources for a community, including voluntary organizations, unions and associations that aim to protect, promote and advocate for the powerless. Economic empowerment teaches entrepreneurial skills, how to take ownership of their assets and how to have income security. Social empowerment teaches youth about social inclusion and literacy as well as helping kids find the resources to be proactive in their communities. Cultural empowerment aims to recreate cultural practices and redefine cultural rules and norms for youth. Through these dimensions of empowerment, programs can work on empowering youth in one or more aspects of their lives.

=== Goals of empowerment ===
Youth empowerment programs are aimed at creating healthier and higher qualities of life for underprivileged or at-risk youth. The five competencies of a healthy youth are: (1) positive sense of self, (2) self- control, (3) decision-making skills, (4) a moral system of belief, and (5) pro-social connectedness. Developmental interventions and programs have to be anchored on these competencies that define positive outcomes of healthy youth.

=== Measurable empowerment ===
Over the last two decades, quality of life (QOL) has emerged as an important unit of measurement to evaluate the success of empowerment programs. It is used as a goal of programs and as well as an indicator of effectiveness. However, there is no standard definition of QOL. A person's QOL is dependent upon subjective evaluation of the individual aspects of that individual's life.

=== Positive development settings ===
Youth empowerment programs thrive in positive developmental settings. Positive developmental settings promote youth competence, confidence and connections. Two features of the positive developmental youth settings are supportive relationships and support for efficacy and mattering. Supportive relationships are those that are between youth and non-familial adults that foster trust and respect. Support for efficacy and mattering specifically focuses on youth being active, instrumental agents of change in their communities, collective decision-making and adults listen to and respect their voice.

== Youth empowerment programs ==
There are various types of empowerment programs across the globe that empower youth through many different tactics and programs. Programs can operate in a variety of settings. The majority of programs operate in more than one setting, which may be a key factor in their success. The beneficial outcomes to youth empowerment programs are improved social skills, improved behavior, increased academic achievement, increased self-esteem and increased self-efficacy.

There are programs are aimed at just empowering women and young girls. Regardless of specific goals or methods, empowering effects include improving women's wellbeing, self-esteem, and self-efficacy, and enhancing social status by teaching technical and organizational skills.

Other youth empowerment programs are focused on poverty alleviation. Living standards are for those living in poverty are declining causing forms of deprivation as it relates to food, resources and education. Programs aimed at empowering poor youth, work toward livelihood protection or livelihood promotion.

There are also empowerment movements that use the social action model, aiming for disadvantaged people to become empowered, organized, and educated so that they may create change. These programs advocate for constructive confrontations to enhance the social power of people who are considered disadvantaged. Another model is the 5C's model that focuses on emphasizing competence, confidence, connection, character and caring. A sixth C of contribution to society was later added. This model focuses primarily on engagement as a key marker of positive youth development, emphasizing the need to foster initiative. Youth-adult partnerships are another type of empowerment method used around the world. This method has been defined as a developmental process and a community practice. The partnership involves people of different ages working together on community issues over a period of time. The method emphasizes reciprocity among adults and youth with a focus on shared decision making and reflective learning. The concept of shared control is key for empowering youth.It is the courage to do good things.

Youth empowerment has also been used as a framework to prevent and reduce youth violence. Research shows that these youth empowerment programs can improve conflict avoidance and resolution skills, increase group leadership skills, and civic efficacy and improve ethnic identity and reduce racial conflict.

=== Examples of youth empowerment programs ===
Around the globe there are various empowerment programs focused on a wide variety of things and this is not a comprehensive list. Unsuccessful youth empowerment programs have not been carefully documented or published in case studies.

In EU there is EU programme for supporting education, training, youth and sport. For the 2021-2027 period, 10.3% of the Erasmus+ budget – more than EUR 2.5 billion – is earmarked for actions in the field of youth.

In India, Youth Empowerment Foundation, a not for profit organization is focused at uplifting the underprivileged young generation of the society right from providing them with basic education to create a strong foundation for their careers, to developing personality skills, because the youth is the future of the country.

In Namibia, one popular empowerment program is Pots of Hope. Pots of Hope's main goal is to reduce the vulnerability youth to HIV and Aids through education, information and awareness, as well as income security projects. Pots of Hope works by educating, and providing counseling to those in rural settings who do not have access to those resources. This program focuses on organizational empowerment within the community.

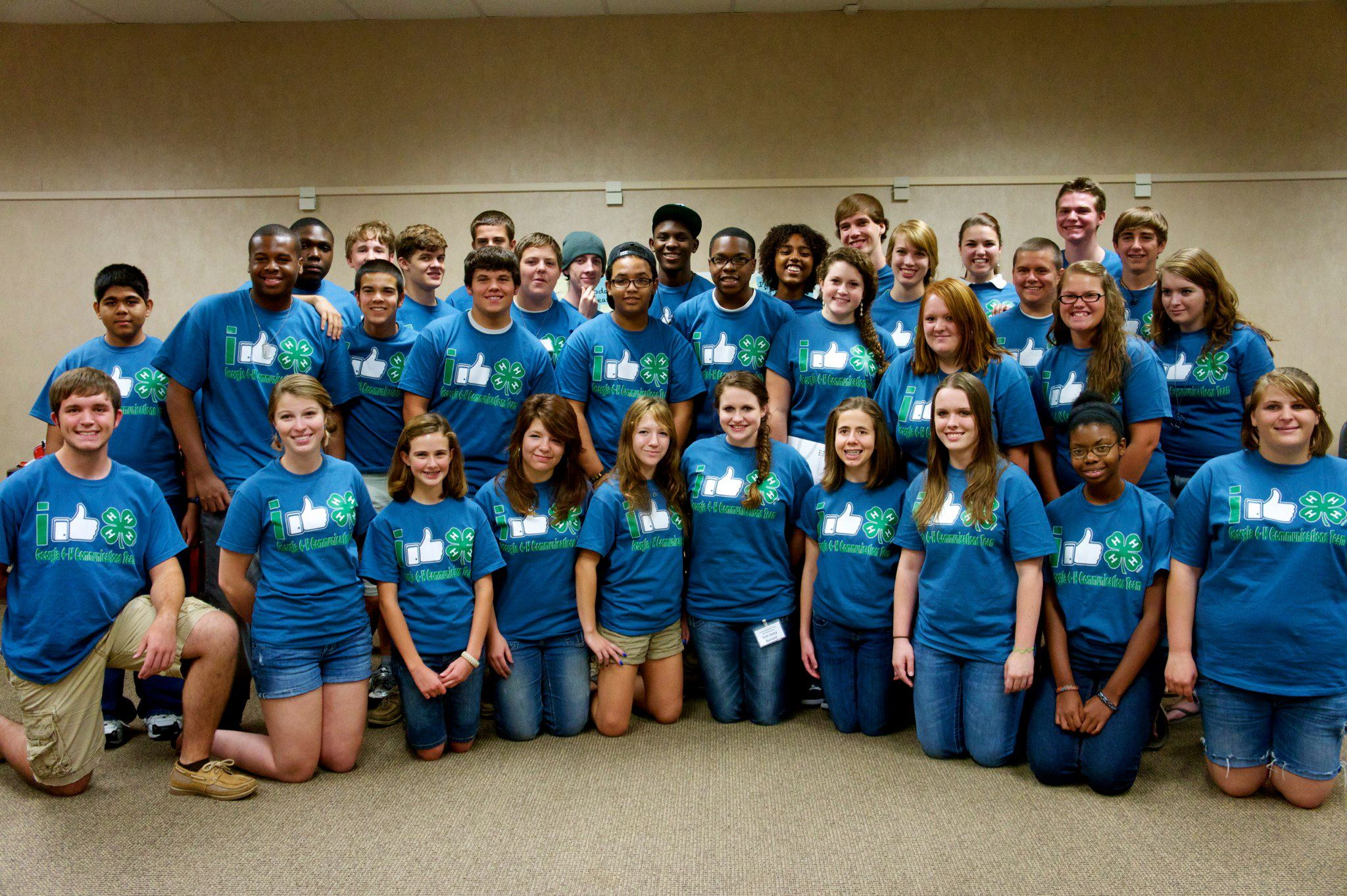
Youth participating in 4-H, a youth empowerment organization primarily in the United States.

Within the United States there are countless empowerment programs for youth. Urban 4-H is a culturally responsive, community-based practice that authentically engages families, youth and the community in the development of youth. Urban 4-H is an example of community empowerment that focuses on the economic and social dimensions of empowerment. The program helps youth build skills to enable them to overcome economic and social barriers while recognizing the importance of self-directed learning for youth. Urban 4-H focuses on empowering youth to think critically, communicate across cultural boundaries and lead others.

In India, youth empowerment has been taken up by other organizations run by young people. Young India Foundation has been working on youth empowerment by directly engaging young people and electoral politics, a first for an organization to do in India.

The United Nations has numerous development programs, one of them being youth empowerment programs. The United Nations provides support to national policy development surrounding empowerment within the five regions. They do this by providing evidence-based policy guidance and programmatic support by promoting the active participation of youth in society. The UNDP promotes inclusive youth participation in effective and democratic governance, economic empowerment of youth, strengthened youth engagement in building resilience in their communities, inclusion of youth in the future development agenda, including through consultations and discussions. The United Nations youth empowerment programs examine all four dimensions of youth empowerment and seeks to improve all of them.

USAID has youth empowerment programs set up around the world that are aimed at civic engagement, access to resources and opportunities for education and employment.

For a more comprehensive list: List of youth empowerment organizations

== Government involvement in empowerment ==
Youth empowerment is often addressed as a gateway to intergenerational equity, civic engagement and democracy building. Local, state, provincial, regional, national, and international government agencies and nonprofit community-based organizations provide programs centered on youth empowerment. Activities involved therein may focus on youth-led media, youth rights, youth councils, youth activism, youth involvement in community decision-making, and other methods.

Each major political party in the United States, including the Republicans, the Democrats, and the Green Party, as well as several major European, African, South American (Peru), and Australian political parties have statements supporting youth empowerment. Youth empowerment is also a central tenet of the United Nations Convention on the Rights of the Child, which every country in the world (minus the United States and South Sudan) has signed into law.

=== The European Union ===
"Youth" in the European Union (EU) is defined as those between the ages of 15 and 29 by the European Institutions.

The EU has been the birthplace of many cultural youth empowerment movements across the past century. Most recently these have included, Fridays for Future, Extinction Rebellion and the 2009 Austrian Student Protests. But has also historically had a connection to youth empowerment through cultural movements such as the punk subculture.

The basis for youth empowerment in the EU is based in articles 165 and 166 of the Treaty on the Functioning of the European Union (TFEU). The youth empowerment objectives of the treaty aimed at encouraging the development of youth exchanges and exchanges between socio-educational instructors (i.e. youth workers) and to encourage the participation of young people in democratic life in Europe.

The European Commission and the European Parliament are the institutions mainly tasked with youth engagement and empowerment. These institutions have set in place various initiatives and projects to achieve these aims including the; Erasmus Programme, Youth Guarantee, European Solidarity Corps, European Youth Week, European Youth Event, Youth Conference and Structured Dialogue.

The Council of Europe also have youth empowerment mechanisms such as the Advisory Council on Youth and the European Youth Centres network.

Youth empowerment projects by EU Institutions is carried out in close cooperation with international NGOs, such as the European Youth Forum, and National Youth Councils.

=== United States ===
Youth empowerment occurs in homes, at schools, through youth organizations, government policy-making and community organizing campaigns. Major structural activities where youth empowerment happens throughout society include community decision-making, organizational planning, and education reform.

Educational activities that cite youth empowerment as an aim include student-centered learning, popular education, and service learning. Free schools and youth-led media organizations often state their intention to empower youth, as well as youth voice, community youth development, and youth leadership programs. Youth empowerment is studied by a variety of scholars including Shawn Ginwright, Henry Giroux, Barry Checkoway, and Mike Males. Their research is highlighted by advocacy from notable activists such as William Upski Wimsatt, Alex Koroknay-Palicz, Salome Chasnoff and Adam Fletcher. One prominent initiative in the United States is the Youth Empowerment Initiative, sponsored by the Obama Foundation Youth Group.

=== Ireland ===
In 2002 Comhairle na nÓg was established in each local authority area as part of the National Children's strategy. Comhairle na nÓg is Irish for Youth Council. These councils are encouraged to include the participation of young people from all walks of life and to tackle local issues affecting young people. It is run by the local county or city councils under the Office of the Minister for Children and Youth Affairs. It is a recognized political organisation by the Irish Government. An extension of Comhairle na nÓg is the Comhairle na nÓg National Executive. The National Executive has one "youth councillor" from every Comhairle na nÓg and deal with issues important to young people. These issues are nominated by young people themselves at an AGM every two years. The Comhairle na nÓg National Executive has the opportunity to express there views in a form of a researched report, ad-campaign, conferences, seminars and to put those views to policy makers.

=== Commonwealth ===
The 53 member countries of the Commonwealth of Nations have all signed up to the Commonwealth Plan of Action for Youth Empowerment (2007–2015). The Plan of Action underpins the work of the Commonwealth Youth Programme (CYP). On the Commonwealth definition, "Young people are empowered when they acknowledge that they have or can create choices in life, are aware of the implications of those choices, make an informed decision freely, take action based on that decision and accept responsibility for the consequences of those actions. Empowering young people means creating and supporting the enabling conditions under which young people can act on their own behalf, and on their own terms, rather than at the direction of others."

The Plan of Action for Youth Empowerment was developed by the Commonwealth Secretariat, working closely with Ministers of Youth and young people themselves. It encourages youth mainstreaming and contains thirteen action points for governments. The first of these is: "Develop and implement measures to promote the economic enfranchisement of young people" through a range of measures ranging from micro-credit and entrepreneurship education through to reviewing macro-economic planning and trade regimes and how they affect young people. Other action points address gender equality, HIV/AIDS, education, the environment, youth participation in decision-making, and democracy and human rights.

== Benefits of empowerment ==
When youth participate in established empowerment programs they see a variety of benefits. The practices of youth involvement and empowerment become embedded within the organizational culture and the community culture. Adults and organizations also benefit from empowerment programs. They both become more communicable and responsive to youth in the community, which leads to program improvements as well as increased participation from youth.

== Critiques of youth empowerment ==
One major critique of youth empowerment is that most programs take a risk-focused approach. There has been a major emphasis on what is going wrong for youth in their lives rather than what goes right. This portrays young people as a problem that need to be fixed and displays the process of development as a process of overcoming risk. This may deter youth from joining youth development programs. The risked-based model can obscure the fact that adolescence is a time when young people master skills and concepts.

== See also ==
- Ageism
- List of youth empowerment organizations
- Youth activism
- Youth suffrage
- Youth voice
- Youth rights
- Youth work
- Mature minor doctrine
- Infantilization
- Positive youth development
- Giovinezza
