= Sonia Yaco =

Youth activist

- Born: 1957 (age 68–69); Ann Arbor, Michigan
- Education: University of Wisconsin–Madison
- Occupation: Human Right Activist

Sonia Yaco was the 1972 Human Rights Party candidate for the Ann Arbor, Michigan, school board. When she ran for office at the age of fifteen, she was the youngest documented candidate ever for a publicly elected school board seat in the United States.

== The election ==
Calling for student voice in school leadership, Yaco was a youth activist with Youth Liberation of Ann Arbor. After announcing her campaign and working with allies from the Human Rights Party, Yaco completed the procedural requirements for candidacy by submitting a petition with signatures from more than eighty-five qualified electors requesting that she be certified as a candidate. The Office of Operations of the Ann Arbor Public Schools denied certification of Yaco's candidacy in an attempt to stop her bid for a seat.

On June 7, 1972, the Human Rights Party requested a court hearing to stop the vote from happening before the trial was held. Their request for a preliminary injunction was denied by a district court judge. The election was held on June 12, 1972, without Yaco's name on the ballot, but Yaco received eight percent of the total votes as a write-in candidate.

The Human Rights Party filed a lawsuit with the US District court for eastern Michigan, Human Rights Party v. Secretary of State for Michigan. It requested that the court declare the statute unconstitutional on the ground that it denies persons under eighteen years of age equal protection of the law in violation of the Fourteenth Amendment to the United States Constitution. The court argued that Court in Oregon v. Mitchell, YMCA Vote at 18 Club v. Board of Elections of the City of N.Y., and McGowan v. Maryland provided precedents of age deterrents. In YMCA Vote at 18 Club... in particular, the court had specifically found that school boards can exclude students under eighteen from running for school board seats, primarily because of concerns about "maturity". The case eventually went to the Supreme Court, which upheld the lower court ruling.

Yaco's campaign has been credited as one factor among several leading to the formation of the city's experimental, alternative Community High School later that year.

== Professional career ==
Yaco went on to attend the University of Wisconsin–Madison in Madison, Wisconsin, and works in the field of archival records and administration. She has been the director of Social Justice Projects and Research at the University of Illinois at Chicago Library, head of Special Collections and University Archives at University of Illinois at Chicago and special collections librarian and university archivist at Old Dominion University. Since August 2018, she has been an associate director of Special Collections and University Archives at Rutgers University.

== See also ==
- Keith Hefner
- History of Youth Rights in the United States
