= YS4C Protests 14 February 2020 =

UK youth-led environment demonstrations

Youth Strike for Climate
- Date: Friday 14 February 2020
- Location: Various locations across the UK
- Caused by: political inaction against global warming
- Goals: Climate change mitigation

The Youth Strike For Climate Protests on 14 February 2020, also known as the Valentines Day Youth Strike for Climate, was a series of Climate Strikes organised by local groups of climate activists across the UK, mostly affiliated to Youth Climate Association Northern Ireland, Scottish Youth Climate Strike, UKSCN, XR Youth or Fridays for Future. They urged students across the country to strike in their city. Cities such as London, Edinburgh, Dundee, Aberdeen, Inverness, Belfast, Omagh, Durham, Glasgow, Brighton and more had students march in their centres. In London, students marched outside of the Houses of Parliament, being led by chants, similar to other parts of the country. Also in London, flares were thrown and police were involved with some not so peaceful protesters while the large group was marching through the streets.
