= History of youth rights in the United States =

The youth rights movement in the United States has long been concerned with civil rights and intergenerational equity. Tracing its roots to youth activism during the Great Depression in the 1930s, the youth rights movement has influenced the civil rights movement, opposition to the Vietnam War, and many other movements. Since the advent of the Internet, youth rights is gaining popularity again.

== 1930s–1950s ==
Youth rights first emerged as a distinct issue in the 1930s. The Great Depression kick started the radicalization and politicization of undergraduates for the first time. Youth Rights first began to emerge through the National Student League, and were furthered greatly when young people across the country banded together to form the American Youth Congress. Concerned with many issues of the times, this organization went so far as to present a Declaration of the Rights of American Youth to the U.S. Congress. The group was so successful that its executive director claimed that it was "a sort of a student brain of the New Deal." While the AYC's campaigns led to the development of the National Youth Administration in the late 1930s, its efforts lost steam when AYC leadership endorsed the Molotov–Ribbentrop Pact; this led to loss of support from both the AYC membership and external political allies, such as First Lady Eleanor Roosevelt. This schism caused the rapid decline of the organization, and shortly after the loss of its political benefactors and member support, the AYC collapsed.

== 1960s–1980s ==
In the 1960s, two landmark U.S. Supreme Court cases, with the majority opinions authored by Justice Abe Fortas were decided in favor of youths' rights. One was Tinker v. Des Moines Independent Community School District that established free speech in public schools, and the other was In re Gault, that gave due process rights in juvenile court proceedings.

The movement emerged again in the early 1960s with the arrival of Students for a Democratic Society and Youth Liberation of Ann Arbor. The effect of the movement on the national Vietnam anti-war movement is widely acknowledged, particularly for its emphasis on youth empowerment through activism. According to Keith Hefner, a leader of Youth Liberation, "Bob Moses, a leader of Freedom Summer in 1964 who now runs the Algebra Project, and Bill Ayers of the Weather Underground who now teaches and writes about youth, are only two of the thousands of 1960s activists who turned their idealism and passion to youth..."

Other successes of the movement such as lowering the voting age to 18 in 1971, and the lowering of other age restrictions on the state level such as lowering the drinking age occurred in the early to mid 70s. The first recorded instance of a high school student campaigning to join a local school board happened in Ann Arbor Michigan as Sonia Yaco, a youth activist associated with Youth Liberation of Ann Arbor, ran as the Human Rights Party candidate. Despite a court challenge hindering her ability to be listed on the ballot, Yaco gained 1,300 votes in the primary.

In 1974, the movement was first defined explicitly in print with the publication of Escape From Childhood by John Holt, in which Holt espoused that,

...[T]he rights, privileges, duties of adult citizens be made available to any young person, of whatever age, who wants to make use of them.

Later in that year another youth rights-focused book, Birthrights by Richard Farson, was published. During the rest of the 1970s and early 1980s, youth rights faced a backlash, succumbing to the more protectionist-oriented and well-established children's rights movement.

In March 1986 the National Child Rights Alliance was founded by seven youth and adults who had been abused and neglected as children. The organization started its life as a children's rights group concerned with protecting children from abuse, but as it grew and evolved it began addressing issues in a more youth rights framework, passing a Youth Bill of Rights in 1989. The organization disbanded in 1999 due to funding issues.

== 1990s–present ==
In the mid-1990s, a youth-led movement for self-determination rights began on the Internet. This reborn Youth Rights movement coalesced in 1996 into Americans for a Society Free from Age Restrictions (ASFAR). Divisions soon emerged between radicals and moderates within ASFAR leading to the formation in 1998 of the National Youth Rights Association (NYRA). NYRA, founded by leaders of ASFAR and YouthSpeak, was founded to professionalize the youth rights movement.

Today, the youth rights movement has become a broad-based movement, with central leadership from NYRA augmented by grassroots organizations around the world.

Organizations such as The Freechild Project and Global Youth Action Network position the youth rights movement within the sphere of international youth activism and youth voice movements. Other organizations, including Oblivion and Peacefire provide support for the youth rights movement, as well.

The 1990s–2000s also saw a resurgence in youth rights books. Two books important for the movement, The Scapegoat Generation and Framing Youth from the late 1990s by Mike Males lay out the case that young people have been unfairly blamed for the ills of society and used as a convenient scapegoat. Males describes the attack on youth as a "national pathology, unwarranted by fact, smokescreen for the failure of adulthood and its leadership to confront larger predicaments." Later, in 2007, Robert Epstein published The Case Against Adolescence. The book was described by Albert Ellis as "one of the most revolutionary books I have ever read." Adam Fletcher released a free publication called, A Short Introduction to Youth Rights through The Freechild Project in 2014.

== See also ==
- Timeline of young people's rights in the United States
- Youth rights
- List of articles related to youth rights
