= Pioneer High School (Ann Arbor, Michigan) =

School in Ann Arbor, Michigan

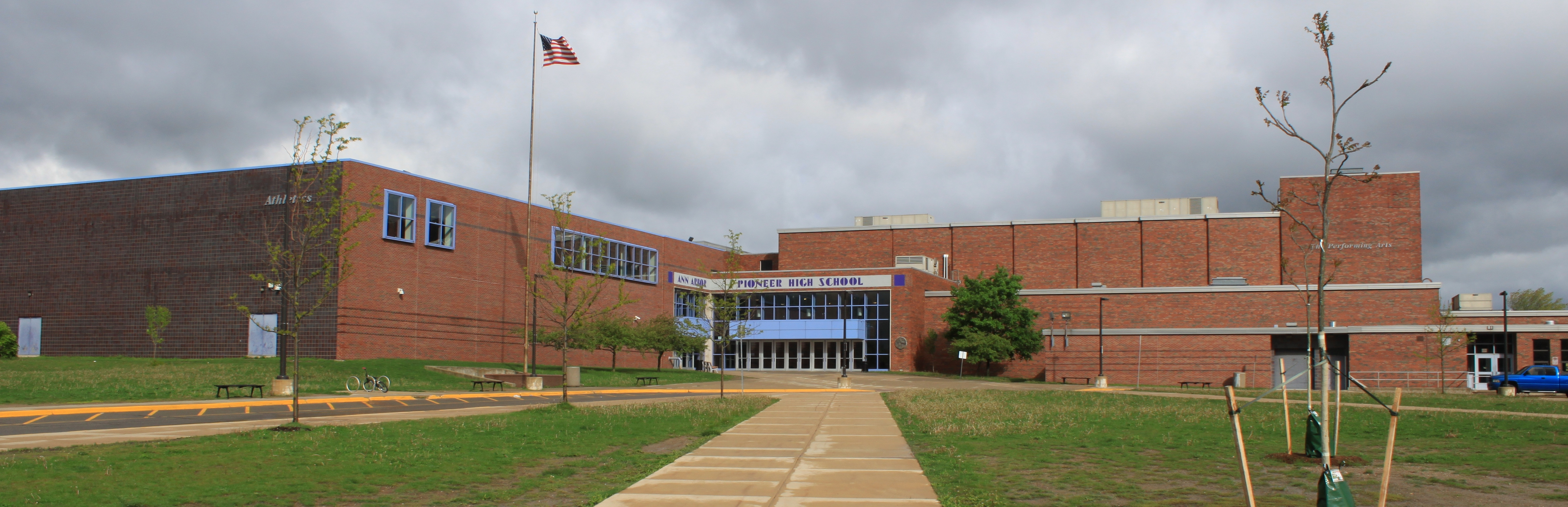

Location
- 601 West Stadium Boulevard; Ann Arbor, Michigan 48103; United States; 42°15′45″N 83°45′18″W

Information
- Type: Public high school
- Motto: Home of Purple Pride
- Established: October 5, 1856
- School district: Ann Arbor Public Schools
- Principal: Desmond Gerard Smith
- Teaching staff: 103.80 (FTE)
- Grades: 9–12
- Enrollment: 1,683 (2023–2024)
- Student to teacher ratio: 16.21
- Colors: Purple & white
- Mascot: Woody the Pioneer
- Nickname: Pioneers
- Website: pioneer.a2schools.org

Student assessments
- 2021–22 school year Change vs. prior year

M-STEP 11th grade proficiency rates (Science / Social Studies)
- Advanced %: 28.3 / 32.4
- Proficient %: 22.4 / 39.2
- PR. Proficient %: 14.3 / 23.9
- Not Proficient %: 35.0 / 4.5

Average test scores
- SAT Total: 1153.4 (▼ −45.5)

Pioneer High School is a public high school in Ann Arbor, Michigan. Founded in 1856, the school was previously called the Union School and Ann Arbor High School. In 2010, Pioneer was listed as a "Silver Medal School" by the U.S. News & World Report.

For years, Pioneer and cross-town Huron High School were among the largest high schools in the state of Michigan due to overcrowding that was eased with the construction and opening of Skyline High School in 2008.

== History ==
Founded in 1856, Pioneer High School has held several names and occupied various buildings. First known as the Union School, the institution opened on October 5, 1856. The school was later renamed Ann Arbor High School, and its yearbook, The Omega, was first published in 1884. In 1904, Ann Arbor High School burned down, and the rebuilt high school opened in 1906 at the corner of Huron and State Streets in Ann Arbor. This structure was later known as the Frieze Building after it was sold to the University of Michigan in 1956; it was demolished by the university in early 2007 to make way for the new North Quad residence hall. Through a local essay contest run by The Ann Arbor News, the mascot nickname, the Pioneers, was chosen in 1936.

Land for a new, larger building was purchased from the University of Michigan in 1950. The new site, on West Stadium Blvd west of South Main Street, is directly southwest of the University of Michigan Football Stadium and had been used for game day parking, a tradition that continues under school district ownership. Construction of the new Ann Arbor High School building started in 1953 and was completed in time for all classes to move the new location for the fall of 1956. By the 1960s, the new building had already reached capacity, and thus the school board established Huron High School on the city's east side as the city's second comprehensive high school, a much more academically advanced school. The old school was renamed to Pioneer High School starting in 1968. Huron began operating as a separate school during the 1968–69 school year, before Huron's building was completed, so students from the old and new schools shared the Pioneer building that year on a split schedule with Pioneer students attending classes in the morning and Huron students in the afternoon.

In 1971, Pioneer II, an experimental offshoot of Pioneer High School, was established. The school utilized a small, self-selected group of Pioneer faculty and students working under "free-school" principles, and eventually became Earthworks High School before merging with Community High School in 1978.

Pioneer High School was the first high school in the US to have a planetarium, which was donated to the school in 1956 by the Argus Camera Company. As of October 2012, it held the record for being the longest continuously run planetarium in a school in the western hemisphere.

As of July 2023, the principal is Desmond G. Smith.

== Extracurricular activities ==
=== Athletics ===
==== Highlights ====
- Women's Track & Field and Cross Country: 20 team state championships, over 200 All-State recipients, and more than 50 All-Americans.
- Field Hockey: 21 state championships, including five straight from 2005 to 2009.

==== Football ====
Pioneer has won two MHSAA State Championships (in 1984 and 1987) and 42 league titles; they currently compete in the Southeastern Conference Red Division. Historically, the Pioneers are one of top high school football programs in the state with 737 victories, second all-time behind Muskegon (as of the 2019 season).

=== Theater ===
The Pioneer Theatre Guild won Class A State Championships in 1986 when they performed William Saroyan's Hello Out There, and again in 1988 when they performed Sam Shephard's Fool For Love. In the fall of 2006, the Pioneer Theatre Guild was the first high school theater company to do a stage production of Disney's High School Musical, Willy Wonka, and Miss Saigon. Pioneer Theatre Guild was chosen to perform several "musical pilots" by Musical Theatre International, including The Little Mermaid (2015), Rock of Ages (2016), and The Hunchback of Notre Dame (2016). Pioneer Theatre Guild has put on several popular productions including Les Misérables, Disney's Beauty and the Beast, Little Shop of Horrors, Romeo and Juliet, Hair, The Wizard of Oz, Thoroughly Modern Millie, and Urinetown. In both 2009 and 2010 Pioneer Theatre Guild placed second in the Michigan Interscholastic Forensic Association's theater competition.

=== Music ===
Pioneer has three separate music departments: band, choir, and orchestra. Pioneer's band is split into four different classes, of increasing difficulty. It has a varsity band, two concert bands(concert band white and concert band purple, the latter being higher level), and symphony band. Any students wishing to do band can be accepted to varsity band without an audition. Students wishing to move to a higher level band must audition. Pioneer also offers a jazz band.

Pioneer's orchestra program's hierarchy is similar to that of the band program. The hierarchy is philharmonic orchestra, two concert orchestras (concert white and concert purple, the latter being the step above), and symphony orchestra. Philharmonic orchestra is offered to anyone wishing to join orchestra. Students audition to get seats in the higher level orchestras.

Pioneer's choral program include introductory-level choruses, Cantando (for Soprano and Alto voices) and Cantare (for Tenor, Baritone, and Bass voices). Beyond the introductory level, there is Bel Canto (for intermediate level treble voices) and A Cappella (for advanced students of all voice parts).

Pioneer's music program won its eighth Grammy Award from the Grammy Foundation in 2015, an award which goes to the best High School music programs in the United States each year.

== Notable alumni ==
- Ron Asheton, musician
- Scott Asheton, musician
- Eric Betzig, 1978: co-recipient of the 2014 Nobel Prize in Chemistry
- Anders Bjork, professional ice hockey player
- Keith Bostic, 1979: professional football player and NFL coach
- Ken Burns, 1971: film director and producer
- Ric Burns, 1972: filmmaker
- Rose Woodallen Chapman (1875–1923), 1895, lecturer, author and editor
- Ian Cole, 2007: professional hockey player
- Ken Dyer, 1964: professional football player
- Bob Elliott, 1973: professional basketball player and sport commentator
- Adam Fox (born 1998), hockey player, defenseman, New York Rangers
- Alison Gregorka, Olympic silver medalist in water polo, 2008
- Zach Grenier, 1972: actor
- Charles J. Guiteau (student in 1859; did not graduate): assassin of President James A. Garfield
- Jim Harbaugh, (student in 1982; did not graduate): professional football player and coach
- John Harbaugh, 1980: professional football coach
- Keith Hefner, 1972: MacArthur Fellow, 1989
- Virginia Hendrickson Irvin, 1921: painter
- George Jewett, 1889: first African-American football player in the Big Ten
- Kara Lynn Joyce, Olympic swimmer
- James Kelly (born 1993), basketball player in the Israel Basketball Premier League
- Phil Kessel, 2005: professional hockey player
- Joneigh Khaldun, 1998: Chief Medical Executive for the State of Michigan
- Bruce Kimball: 1984 Olympic silver medalist in diving
- Bill Kirchen, 1965:, musician
- Peter Kornbluh, 1974: author
- Jack R. Lousma, 1954: NASA astronaut
- Randy Napoleon, 1995; musician
- Ashley Park, 2009; actress
- Zack Pearlman, actor
- Iggy Pop, 1965: musician, and actor
- Zach Putnam, 2005: professional baseball player
- James van Riemsdyk, 2007: professional hockey player
- Brian Rolston, 1991: professional hockey player
- Jordan Schroeder, 2008: hockey player
- Bob Seger, 1963: musician
- Brian Michael Smith, 2001: actor and advocate.
- Jean Smith, 1946: professional baseball player
- Neil Staebler, 1922: U.S. Representative from Michigan
- Troy Terry, professional hockey player
- Tage Thompson, professional hockey player for the Buffalo Sabres of the NHL
- Frank Vatrano, professional hockey player
- Thomas Huckle Weller, co-recipient of the 1954 Nobel Prize in Medicine
- Bob Westfall, 1938: All-American football fullback; played for Michigan 1939–1941; played for Detroit Lions 1944-1947; 1945 All-pro; inducted into the College Football Hall of Fame in 1987
- Ryan Whitney, 2001: professional hockey player and podcaster
- Jason Zucker, professional hockey player

== See also ==
- Ann Arbor Public Schools
- Community High School
- Huron High School
- Skyline High School
- International Academy
- Saginaw Arts and Sciences Academy
