= Community High School (Ann Arbor, Michigan) =

High school in Ann Arbor, Michigan, United States

Coordinates: 42.284008°N 83.744488°W

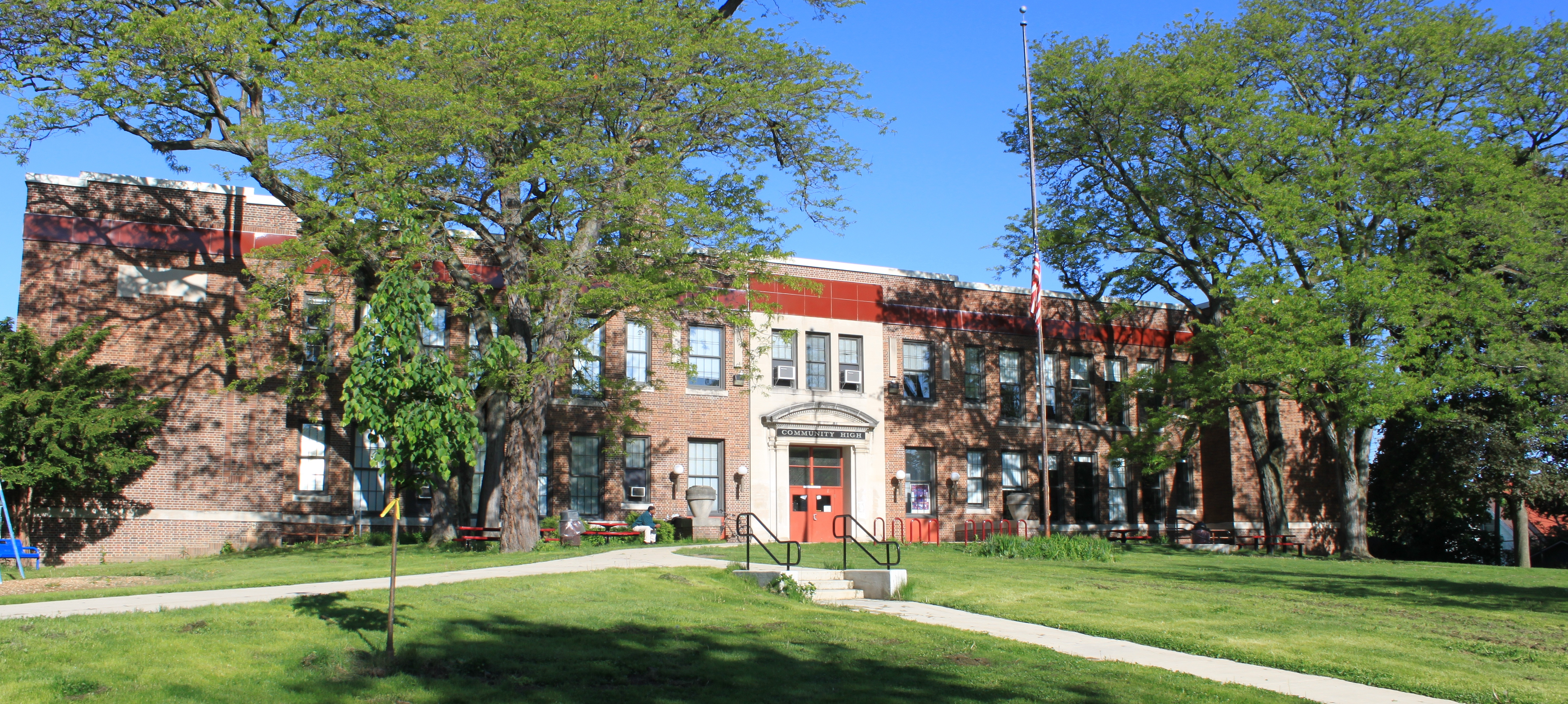
- Community High School, Ann Arbor MI

Location
- 401 North Division Street; Ann Arbor, Michigan 48104; United States

Information
- School type: Public, magnet high school
- Established: 1972
- School district: Ann Arbor Public Schools
- Teaching staff: 33.40 (FTE)
- Enrollment: 509 (2023–2024)
- Student to teacher ratio: 15.24
- Website: community.a2schools.org

Student assessments
- 2021–22 school year Change vs. prior year

M-STEP 11th grade proficiency rates (Science / Social Studies)
- Advanced %: 48.4 / 39.7
- Proficient %: 23.8 / 33.3
- PR. Proficient %: 10.3 / –
- Not Proficient %: 17.5 / ≤5

Average test scores
- SAT Total: 1176.7 (▼ −34.4)

Community High School (CHS) is a public, magnet high school serving grades 9–12 in Ann Arbor, Michigan, in the United States. Located on a 3.2-acre (13,000 m^{2}) site at 401 North Division Street near the city's Kerrytown district, CHS today enrolls approximately 450 students.

Established in 1972, CHS was one of the first public magnet schools in the country, offering students a smaller alternative to the city's three large comprehensive high schools. It is one of the few surviving institutions among the wave of experimental high schools that were founded across the United States in the 1970s.

Unlike many public alternative schools in other cities, CHS is not restricted to a particular student population (such as "gifted" or "underachieving" students), nor does it explicitly emphasize one particular area of study over others. Founded on an experimental "school-without-walls" concept, CHS continues to offer opportunities to interact with the surrounding community, primarily through its open campus and its Community Resources Program, an avenue for students to design their own courses for credit through experiential learning projects in the Ann Arbor area. In contrast to many traditional high schools, CHS has been known for its small size, its open campus and down to earth student participation in school governance and staff hiring, and loose attendance policies more similar to those of colleges than those at most high schools. The school has also eschewed many of the characteristics of traditional high schools, including interscholastic sports programs, valedictorians, dress codes, detention, hall passes, changing bells, mascots (aside from a rainbow-spangled zebra).

== Early history ==
By the early 1970s, Ann Arbor had developed a reputation as one of the most liberal campus towns in the country. The city played host to numerous radical political organizations, eventually electing three members of the left-wing Human Rights Party to its city council. Meanwhile, the teenage group Youth Liberation of Ann Arbor was carving out a role as a national pioneer in the nascent youth rights movement, with fifteen-year-old member Sonia Yaco's insurgent school-board candidacy earning her 1,300 write-in votes, or eight percent of the total, in spring 1972. Reflecting this non-traditional ethos, the city's school district opened two experimental alternative schools during those years: Earthworks (originally Pioneer II) in fall 1971, and Community High School (CHS) in fall 1972.

CHS's informal mascot, the rainbow-colored AntiZebra, symbolizes nonconformism and individuality

The Community High idea, according to the 1972 blueprint, was to use the city as classroom – thereby creating a "school without walls" where students could develop their own curricula by drawing on experiences and resource people throughout the community. Although the concept was new to Ann Arbor, planners took inspiration from similar innovative programs then springing up in other cities, including the Chicago High School for Metropolitan Studies (est. 1969), Philadelphia's Parkway High School, and Washington, D.C.'s School Without Walls (est. 1971). Reflecting the liberal educational philosophy of the period, other goals in the early CHS proposals were "to provide an opportunity for a heterogeneous group of students and faculty to learn and work together and to combat prejudices based on race, sex, age, lifestyle, and school achievement," and "to foster the development of identity and responsibility." The plan emphasized placing students of all grades in the same classes and programs, and had at its heart the Community Resources Program and the Forum Program, small units of students integrated by age, sex and race which would provide home bases for counseling and cultural-studies work.

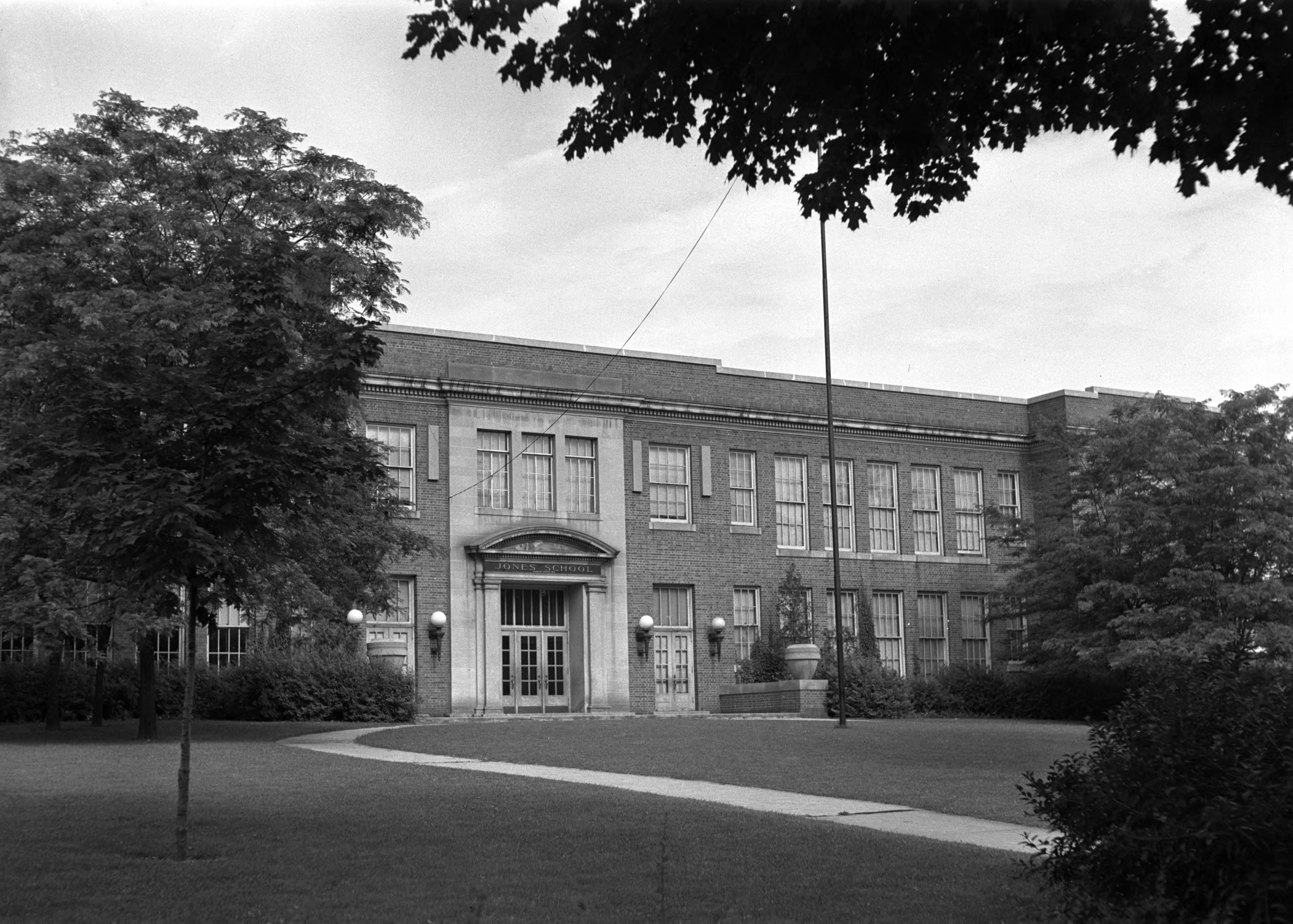
Jones Elementary School in 1937

CHS opened in September 1972, after a $100,000 renovation to an empty downtown building (constructed in 1925) that had formerly housed Jones Elementary School, a majority African-American school which was closed in 1965 due to re-districting for racial-desegregation purposes. Although members of the school board proposed naming classrooms after Ann Arborites who had been killed in the Vietnam War, these plans angered local citizens and teachers who opposed the war, and were never implemented.

The school's first dean, Dean Bodley, told the Ann Arbor News that the school's only formal rules would be two safety precautions: "no smoking except in the student-teacher lounge and persons must wear shoes" – although even these were quickly abandoned. The first commencement, held at the nearby St. Andrew's Episcopal Church, banished caps and gowns, valedictorians and salutorians of traditional graduation ceremonies. The community-based education concept flourished during CHS's first several years, with students developing 569 Community Resource courses in the Ann Arbor community during the fall of 1974 alone. Within the school itself, unorthodox course offerings included subjects as diverse as dream analysis and Eastern philosophy. A 1974 analysis of the school by University of Michigan researchers noted that "[o]verall autonomy in CHS is high", and concluded that "CHS is an organization dedicated to the development of humanistic principles... 'Maximum individuality within maximum community' could well be its banner."

Through the 1970s, enrollment remained in the high 300s. Dr. R. Wiley Brownlee, a civil-rights activist and former principal of Willow Run High School in Michigan, became CHS dean in the school's second year. In his time at Willow Run High, Brownlee had taken a conciliatory approach to mounting racial tensions at the school, an approach that eventually cost him his job. His insistence on fair treatment for minority students had also propelled him into national headlines when, in 1971, he was assaulted at gunpoint, then tarred and feathered, by members of the Michigan Ku Klux Klan following a Willow Run school-board meeting. In 1974, shortly after taking the reins at Ann Arbor's Community High, Brownlee characterized the student body as sixty-percent "high achievers who are politically disenchanted" and forty-percent students who were "academically disenchanted".

In October 1973, The Wall Street Journal described Community High's efforts to overcome what CHS counselor Andrades Smith called "widespread and commonly practiced" sexism in the hiring of teachers, career counseling of students, and classroom curricula. As the Journal reported, "Partly as a result of pressure brought by militant feminists both inside and outside the school system, training seminars for teachers were organized earlier this year to explore subtle and overt sex discrimination at Community High." These consciousness-raising workshops, which included talks by female professionals and "role reversals" of traditional sex roles, served as model for a program adopted the following year throughout the Ann Arbor school system.

In 1975, CHS became the first alternative school in Michigan to receive accreditation from the North Central Association of Colleges and Schools. Accreditation officials, according to news reports, were mildly taken aback by the school's eccentricities, questioning the lack of any non-smoking area within the school and some students' practice of bringing their pets to school.

== Merger with Earthworks ==
Through the mid-1970s, CHS was not the only alternative high school in Ann Arbor. Earthworks High School, a smaller school with an even more experimental culture, had been founded as "Pioneer II" in 1971. The school was initially an offshoot of Pioneer High School, one of the city's two (at the time) large traditional schools, and it eventually was merged with CHS.

Largely student-driven, the 1971 Earthworks proposal declared that students must be equipped "to function creatively, contributively, responsibly and happily in a world whose central characteristic is radical change," a task at which traditional institutions were allegedly failing. Students and teachers explained that they sought to depart from "the authoritarian model of teaching", where teachers are considered "imparters of knowledge" who are seldom mistaken. The school board approved the project despite a rebuke from the board of Ann Arbor's Roman Catholic St. Thomas School (now Gabriel Richard), which called the plan "discriminatory by giving support to one group looking for alternatives."

Diversity proved one of the main stumbling blocks. Before the program opened, some citizens attacked the school board for not considering minority issues, and in the first year, only five students were of minority background (three African American, and two Asian). Difficulties aside, Earthworks opened in October 1971 with 108 students choosing to attend. The school operated in a three-room building at 995 North Maple Road, the former site of Fritz Elementary School, now furnished with rugs and mattresses instead of desks and chairs.

Operating under "free-school" principles, Earthworks students selected their own teachers from among those at the sponsoring Pioneer High School. In addition to three full-time teachers and one administrator, they recruited about a dozen tutors from the University of Michigan, as well as fifty supporting resource people in the community. During the first two weeks of operation, students and teachers worked together in a series of meetings and "rap sessions" to develop a curriculum – one that centered on allowing students to control their own education, work at their own speed, and follow their own interests; and which utilized "contracts" setting out individual student goals and methods to achieve them. As the Huron Valley Advisor explained, subjects ranged "from geometry, algebra, and American history to Russian literature, organic gardening and parapsychology (witchcraft) – which is taught by a student." Some in the traditional schools derided Earthworks as "a hippy kindergarten". But a 1972 Ann Arbor News survey reported that students were pleased with the freedom, power, emphasis on individuality, and ability to control their own educations, although a few disliked the school's unorganized nature and felt that some students failed to thrive with the radical lack of structure.

By the end of 1977, enrollment at Earthworks was down to fifty students, with two full-time teachers. Feeling that the program would complement that at Community High, the school board merged the two high schools in 1978, despite qualms from many in each program that the Earthworks identity would be lost in the merger, and that CHS would grow too large. After its absorption, Earthworks became the name of a separate educational track at CHS, and the program continued to run through the late 1990s as a multidisciplinary experiential-learning class emphasizing community activism.

== Community High in the 1980s and 1990s ==
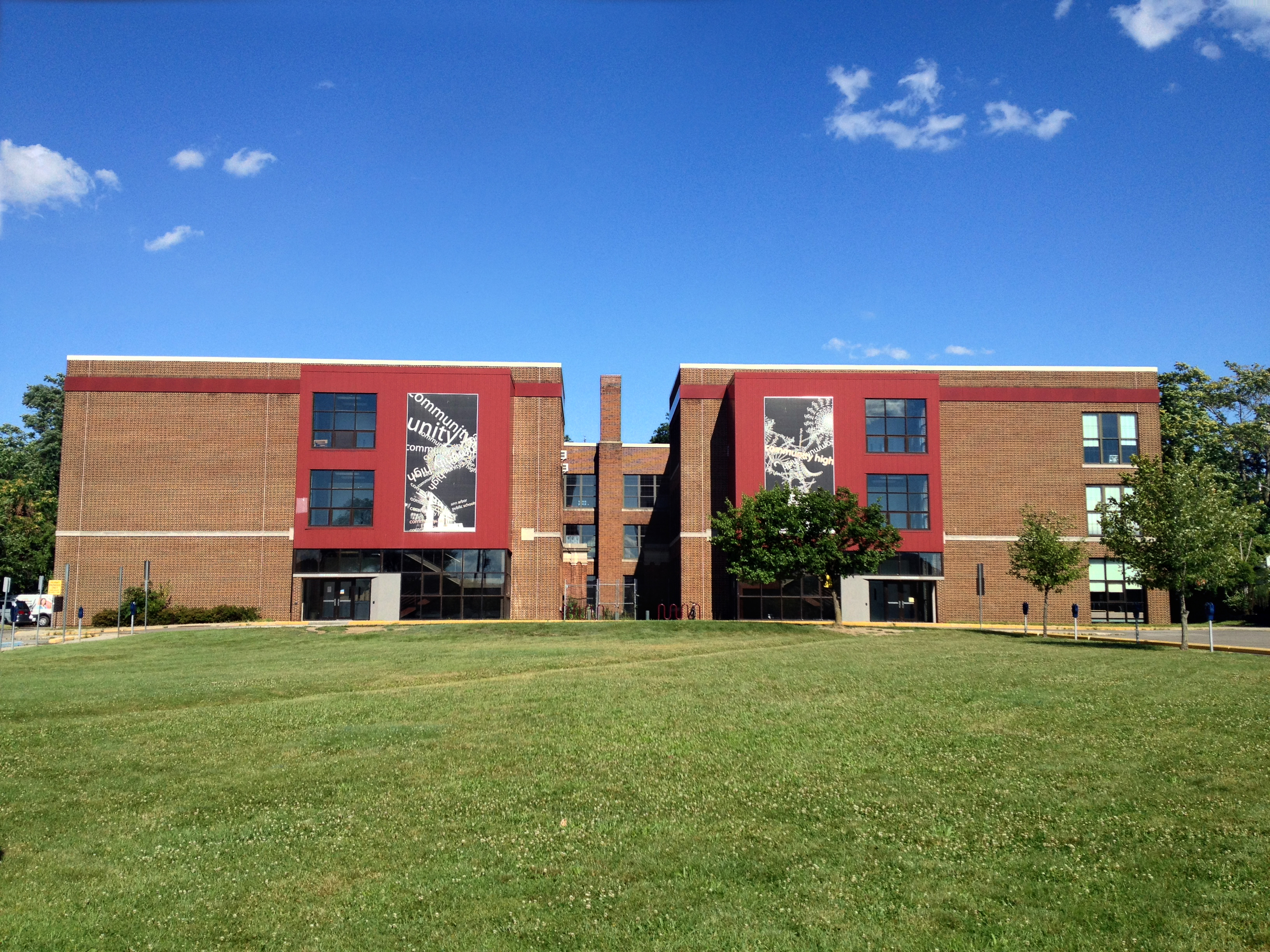
Rear view from N. Fifth and Detroit streets

Through the 1980s, Community High's programs continued on much as they had in the heady days of the 1970s, even as the experimental educational philosophies of the 1970s receded elsewhere in the state and the nation. During this decade, the school had a much lower profile in Ann Arbor, and it was often stereotyped as a haven for misfits or drug users, with its detractors affixing unflattering nicknames such as "Commie High" or "Community Get-High School". This bad reputation meant that anyone who wanted or needed to be there could do so, and it became a haven, instead, for students with a strong desire to create their own educational direction. It was known as a place with no cliques, and by the seventeenth year of its existence, there had been a grand total of two physical confrontations between students in the school's entire history. During the 1991–92 academic year, CHS temporarily moved to alternate facilities at Stone School in eastern Ann Arbor while its downtown building was renovated and expanded. The year was marred by a series of conflicts that arose between CHS students and students in adult-education programs already located at Stone School, and the alternate location made it difficult to maintain programs that depended on CHS's downtown setting. Still, through the 1980s the school continued to draw a steady stream of enthusiastic applicants dissatisfied with the strictures of the city's traditional high schools.

By 1990, however, CHS had emerged from its status as a quirky, largely unknown alternative, on the road to becoming one of the most desirable and high-profile educational options in the area. In 1989, the school had its first-ever waiting list for students, and through the mid- and late 1990s its growing popularity and unorthodox approach once again drew statewide media coverage. CHS also began to attract attention in the municipal political arena, eventually becoming one of the main issues in Ann Arbor's contentious school-board election of June 1994.

=== School-board election of 1994 ===
In 1994, CHS found itself at the center of a bitter and divisive school-board election. Following the 1993 passage of a Michigan state referendum capping local property taxes, money for schools had grown tighter. At the same time, the city's two traditional high schools faced mounting problems with overcrowding.

The conservative education group Citizens for Better Education (CBE), which had held a 6–3 majority on the Ann Arbor school board since 1991, favored the city's traditional high schools and a "back-to-basics" educational approach. With student populations increasing dramatically in size at the traditional high schools, CBE board members questioned both the small size and higher per-pupil spending at CHS. They proposed expanding the school by 100-200 students, and equalizing its per-pupil expenditures with those at the city's larger schools. Proponents of alternative education countered that expanding the student body so drastically would destroy the school's intimate ethos, and that the higher per-pupil spending resulted from CHS offering many classroom places, uncompensated, to students from other high schools who commuted for one or two classes. However, their proposal for a new alternative school to take pressure off the existing high schools was quashed by the board's conservative majority.

The June 1994 school-board election thus hinged, in large measure, on the alternative-schools issue. A liberal slate of candidates known as New Challenge took on the three CBE incumbents up for re-election, mobilizing heavy support from Community High parents and students. Two of New Challenge's three candidates—Diane Hockett, Nicholas Roumel, and Ann Lyzenga—were current or recent CHS parents. Meanwhile, students at the school formed a political action committee called Ann Arbor Students for Political Action (AASPA) that contributed $1,313 and many hours of volunteer time to New Challenge efforts. The student PAC, according to state officials, was the first in Michigan formed by teenagers to influence a local race, and it garnered regional press coverage in the process. Though AASPA began as a class project at CHS, it grew to include 150 high school students, representing all three public Ann Arbor high schools of the time.

CBE incumbents criticized the CHS student group – one decrying it in the Detroit Free Press as "narrow-minded, with a narrow focus", another claiming that "Community High is not going to be the moving force in this town." The race was one of the most heated and expensive in the city's history, with the two slates running cable TV ads (a first for Ann Arbor school elections); the New Challenge ad was produced by another CHS parent volunteer, film/video professional Dave Anderson. The two opposing campaigns spent a combined $32,000, more than in any previous campaign. In the end, New Challenge swept to victory, defeating all three CBE incumbents and assuring the continuance of Community High School in its existing format. The new, more liberal school-board majority soon revived plans to establish another alternative school, known simply as "The New School", although that project was curtailed in 2000 after four difficult years of operation.

=== Enrollment battles ===
From 1989 to the present, CHS has attracted far more applicant students than it can accommodate. The process for choosing which students may attend, determined by the school board, eventually reached farcical levels. A lottery was used in 1992, but in March 1993 a first-come/first-served method produced a twenty-four-hour line-up on the school's front lawn. In 1995, the line formed three days ahead of time; in 1996, the method produced a two-week line-up outside the school district's administration building, complete with mobile homes, portable toilets, roving television news crews, and sardonic editorial cartoons in the local press.

In May 1991, the school board had agreed that black students on the waiting list would receive priority, in order to boost CHS's relatively low numbers of African Americans. But many CHS students charged that the first-come/first-served admissions method of the mid-1990s was producing a less diverse student body, one composed of teenagers whose parents (or, in several cases, parents' secretaries) could afford to take many days off from work to hold down positions in line. The return to the lottery procedure in 1997, however, eliminated the frantic annual queuing ritual. By the early 2000s the number of applications was still growing each year, with approximately three students applying for each of the 108 slots for incoming freshmen. It should also be noted that Ann Arbor high school students who are not accepted into Community High School by way of raffle may still attend the school part-time as a dual enrolled student. Dual enrolled students are primarily enrolled in classes at one of Pioneer, Huron, or Skyline High School, but school bus shuttles commute these students back and forth from Community High School at various times during the school day. As such, most students who dual enroll take 2 or 3 courses at Community High School, and the rest at their primary high school. Despite the enrollment-procedure changes, the school remains less racially diverse than the city's two large traditional schools. Approximately 15.2 percent of the CHS student body came from racial-minority backgrounds as of 2005, compared with 29.1 at Pioneer High and 40.8 percent at Huron High, making CHS, as former Dean Peter Ways wrote in 2007, "one of the least diverse schools in Ann Arbor."

Over the past decade, a number of local critics have argued that the high number of applications for CHS student slots suggested serious weaknesses at the city's traditional high schools. But, to the extent that applicants are motivated by overcrowding at the city's other schools, the problem was expected to be ameliorated following the opening of Skyline High School, a third traditional school, in 2008. The class of 2009 had the second-highest ACT scores in the state of Michigan. As one of the school's many Community Resource Program offerings, Ann Arbor-based Google AdWords developed a class for CHS students in 2007. In 2008, planners in Albuquerque, New Mexico, filed an application to open a charter school in that city, named Ray of Hope High School, which would be "modeled after Community High School in Ann Arbor" and developed through intensive research visits to CHS.

== Notable alumni ==
- Gene Sperling, (1977): former economic adviser to President Bill Clinton and director of the National Economic Council, 1996–2000 and 2011–2014.
- Sean Hastings, (1986): founding CEO of HavenCo and co-author of the book God Wants You Dead
- Neda Ulaby, (1989): correspondent for National Public Radio
- Rachel DeWoskin, (1990): screen actress and author
- Shael Polakow-Suransky (1990): president of the Bank Street College of Education; former senior deputy chancellor, New York City Department of Education
- Sasha Polakow-Suransky (1997): editor for Foreign Policy
- Davy Rothbart, (1992): author, radio personality, documentary filmmaker, editor of Found Magazine
- Erin Kamler, (1993): Songwriter and dramatist
- Randy Napoleon, (1995): jazz musician
- Andrew "W.K." Wilkes-Krier, (1997): nationally known punk/metal/noise musician
- Odin Biron, (2003): actor on Russian medical sitcom Interns
- Josh Silverman, CEO of Etsy
- Isaac Vallie-Flagg, professional mixed martial artist, former UFC Lightweight
- Hobbs Kessler, (2021) middle distance runner
- Mei Semones, Jazz influenced Alternative Indie J-pop artist

== See also ==
- Youth empowerment
- Youth voice
- Anarchistic free school
