= Youth Communication =

Youth Communication is a New York City nonprofit youth media organization that promotes youth literacy and civic engagement through youth-led media. It is a registered 501(c)(3).

== History ==
The organization was founded in 1980 by youth rights pioneer Keith Hefner, who won a MacArthur Fellowship for his work with Youth Communication in 1989.

== Program ==
Youth Communication helps marginalized youth develop their potential through reading, writing, and social/emotional skills so that they succeed in school and at work and contribute to their communities. It publishes anthologies of stories by teens, many of which include lesson guides to help teachers and other adults use the stories.

Youth Communication publishes two print magazines and associated websites: YCteen (formerly called New Youth Connections), a general interest magazine for urban teens; and Represent (formerly Foster Care Youth United), a magazine written by and for young people in foster care. Hundreds of stories and lessons by teens in the program are available on the organization's websites.

Youth Communication counts many notable alumni, including authors Edwidge Danticat (Breath Eyes Memory), Veronica Chambers (Mama's Girl), and Gina Trapani (LifeHacker), hip hop writer and actor Bönz Malone, and reporters Rachel Swarns (The New York Times), and Mohamad Bazzi (Newsday).

In 2006, the organization began producing video stories for its YouTube site. They include news videos, personal stories, and "story behind the story" videos in which the teen authors talk about the writing process and why they wrote their stories. Youth Communication worked with outside directors. Ric Burns directed a video about the organization called Changing Lives, One Story at a Time, and Michael "Boogie" Pinckney directed Alternative High, a story about one Youth Communication writer's journey from high school dropout to high school principal.

== Recognition ==
Youth Communication has won numerous awards for its educational publications.

- Coming Up Taller Award (2001) National Endowments for the Arts and Humanities.
- Part of a $20 million grant from the Carnegie Corporation (2007)
- >12 Distinguished Achievement Awards Association of Educational Publishers. It won a 2011 award for best high school curriculum in the Health and Character Education category for Real Men, its program on masculinity for urban teens.
