= Keith Hefner =

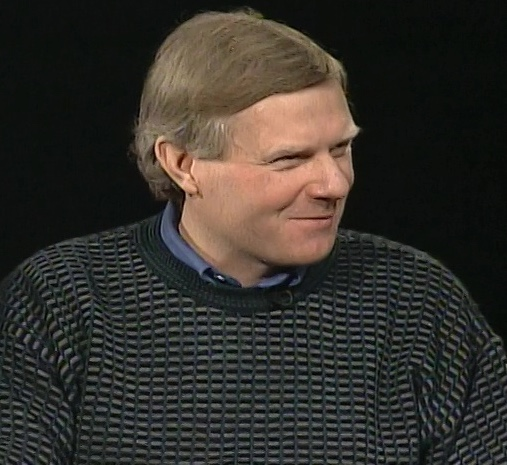
- Hefner on CUNY TV's Urban Agenda (1998)
- Born: Ann Arbor, Michigan
- Occupation: Nonprofit executive

Keith Hefner is the founder and executive director of Youth Communication, an influential nonprofit organization publishing magazines and books by and for youth. The magazines are YCteen (formerly known as New Youth Connections), written by New York City teens, and Represent (formerly known as Foster Care Youth United or FCYU), by and for foster youth. He is also a founder of Youth Liberation of Ann Arbor, a youth rights organization in Michigan.

== Biography ==
After growing up in Ann Arbor, in eleventh grade Hefner was inspired to become involved in the youth-led media field after seeing a high school principal censor the school newspaper. Soon after he started a magazine for local youth activists called FPS.

From 1971 to 1979 Hefner ran Youth Liberation, a youth-led organization that became a national publisher for the youth rights movement. Youth Liberation Press published several of his publications, including How to Start a High School Underground Newspaper, Students and Youth Organizing, and other books about youth rights.

In 1979 Hefner moved to New York City, and after gaining inspiration from a new youth-driven newspaper in Chicago, founded Youth Communication.

== Recognition ==
Hefner has received a great deal of recognition for his work in the fields of youth development, foster care and youth-led media. He won a MacArthur Fellowship in 1989. In 1986 he was a Charles H. Revson Fellow on the Future of New York City at Columbia University. In 1997 he received the Luther P. Jackson Award for Educational Excellence from the New York Association of Black Journalists.

== See also ==
- History of Youth Rights in the United States
- Sonia Yaco
