= Kerrytown, Ann Arbor =

Coordinates: 42°17′05″N 83°44′45″W

Kerrytown
- Cultural enclave and neighborhoods
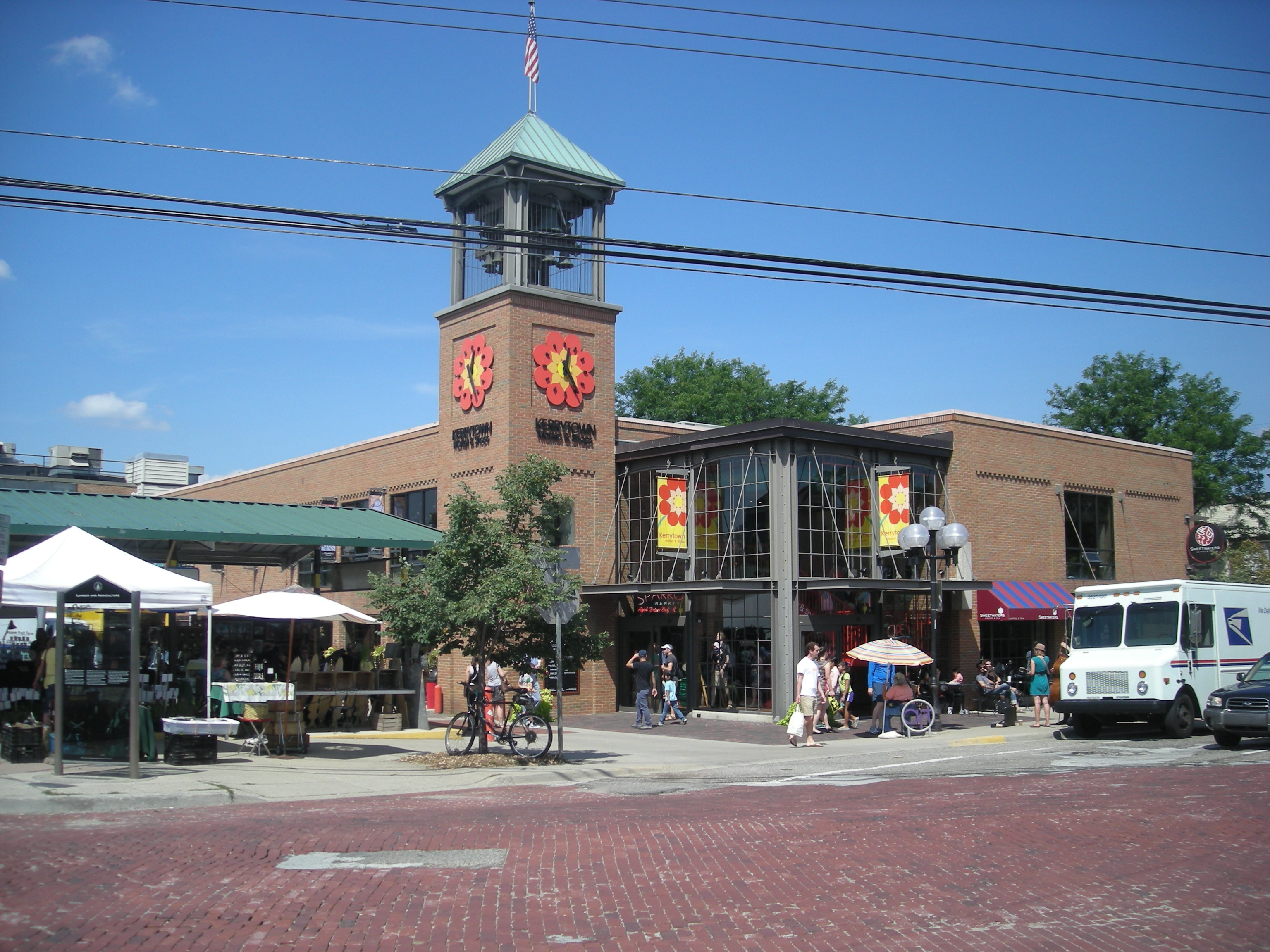
- Kerrytown Market & Shops
- Interactive map of Kerrytown
- Country: United States
- State: Michigan
- County: Washtenaw
- City: Ann Arbor
- Time zone: UTC-5 (Eastern Standard Time (North America))
  - Summer (DST): UTC-4 (Eastern Daylight Time (North America))
- ZIP code: 48104
- Area code: 734
- Website: kerrytowndistrict.org

Kerrytown borders the Old Fourth Ward historic district in Ann Arbor, Michigan, USA. It is approximately bound by Main Street to the west, Depot Street to the north, Division Street to the east, and Huron Street to the south. It is known for its brick streets and sidewalks, diverse array of shops and vibrant culture. It includes several iconic establishments, including the Ann Arbor Farmers Market, the Kerrytown Concert House, Zingerman's Deli, the Ann Arbor Hands-On Museum, and Community High School. Kerrytown is also known for its LGBT population and progressive politics.

The Kerrytown Farmers' Market, started in May 1919 and moved to its current location in 1921, is a central public space in the district.

== History ==
Kerrytown was part of the original Village of Annarbour, settled first in 1824 and incorporated in 1851 and was named after County Kerry in Ireland.

The Kerrytown District Association organizes events in the neighborhood. In July 2017, the Association began First Fridays, an event occurring on the first Friday of every month to promote local business and tourism. Kerrytown also hosts an annual Christmas tree lighting.

Ann Arbor Pride, the pride parade of Ann Arbor, has been celebrated annually in Kerrytown since 1994. The neighborhood was the site of Aut Bar, the only gay bar in Ann Arbor, established in 1995 and closed in 2020.

== Gallery ==
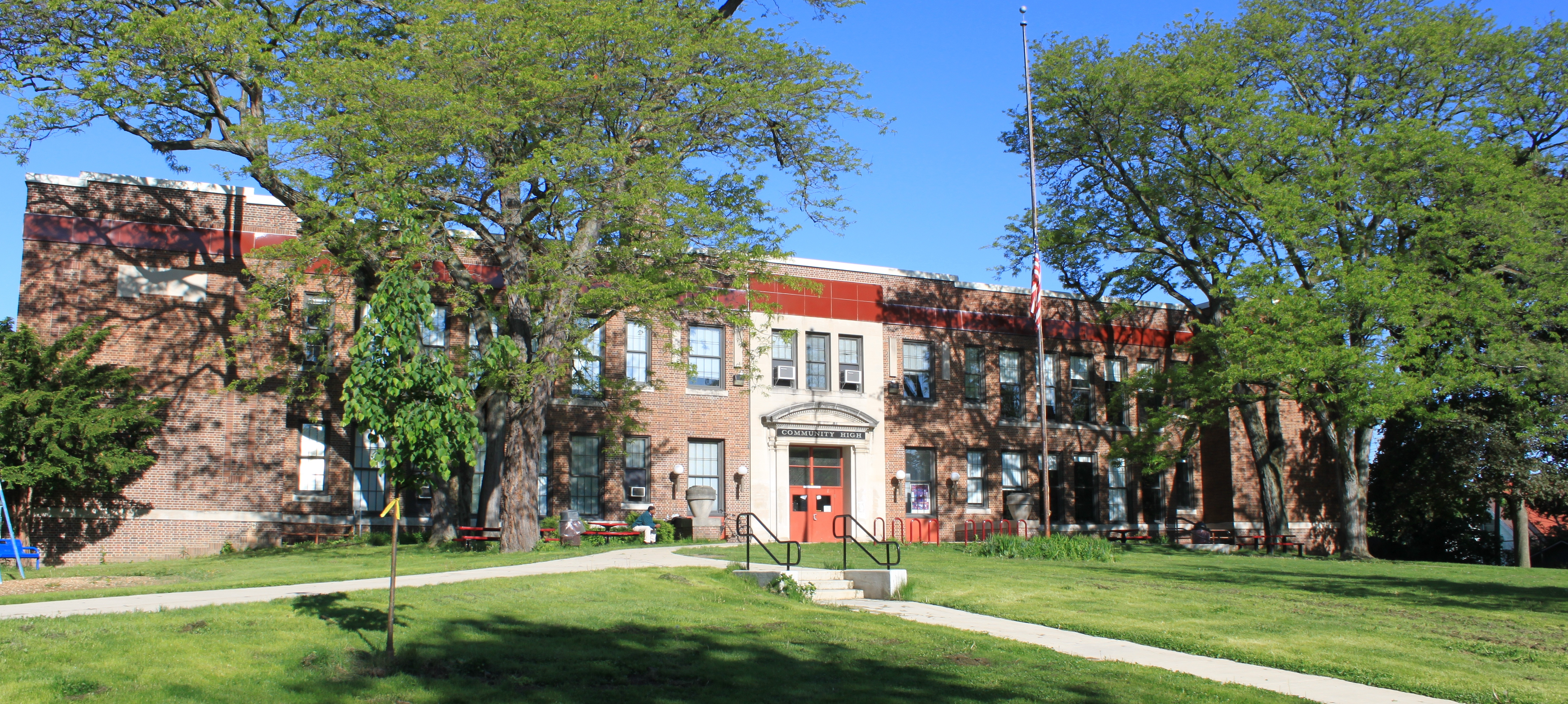
Community High School

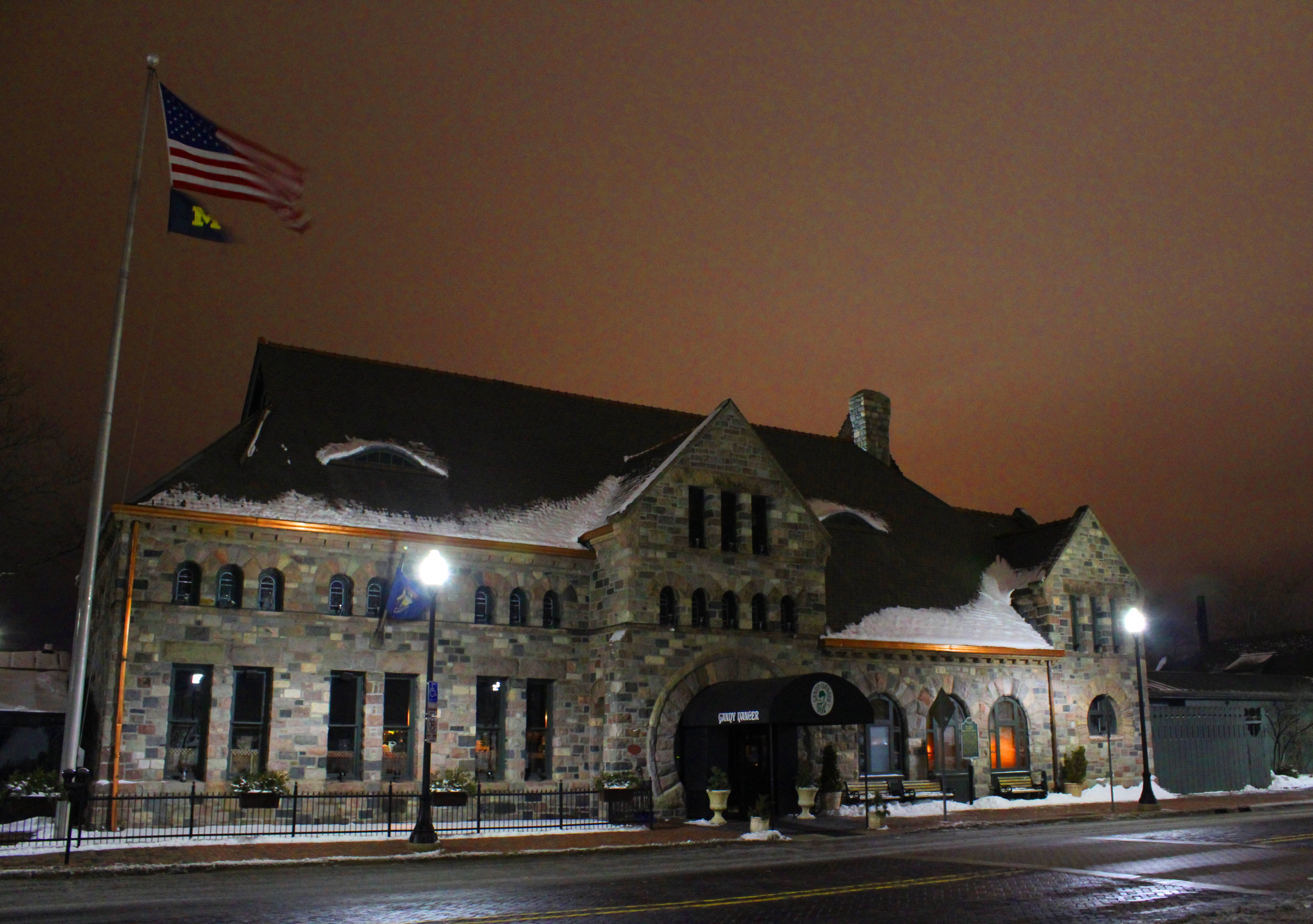
Michigan Central Railroad Depot

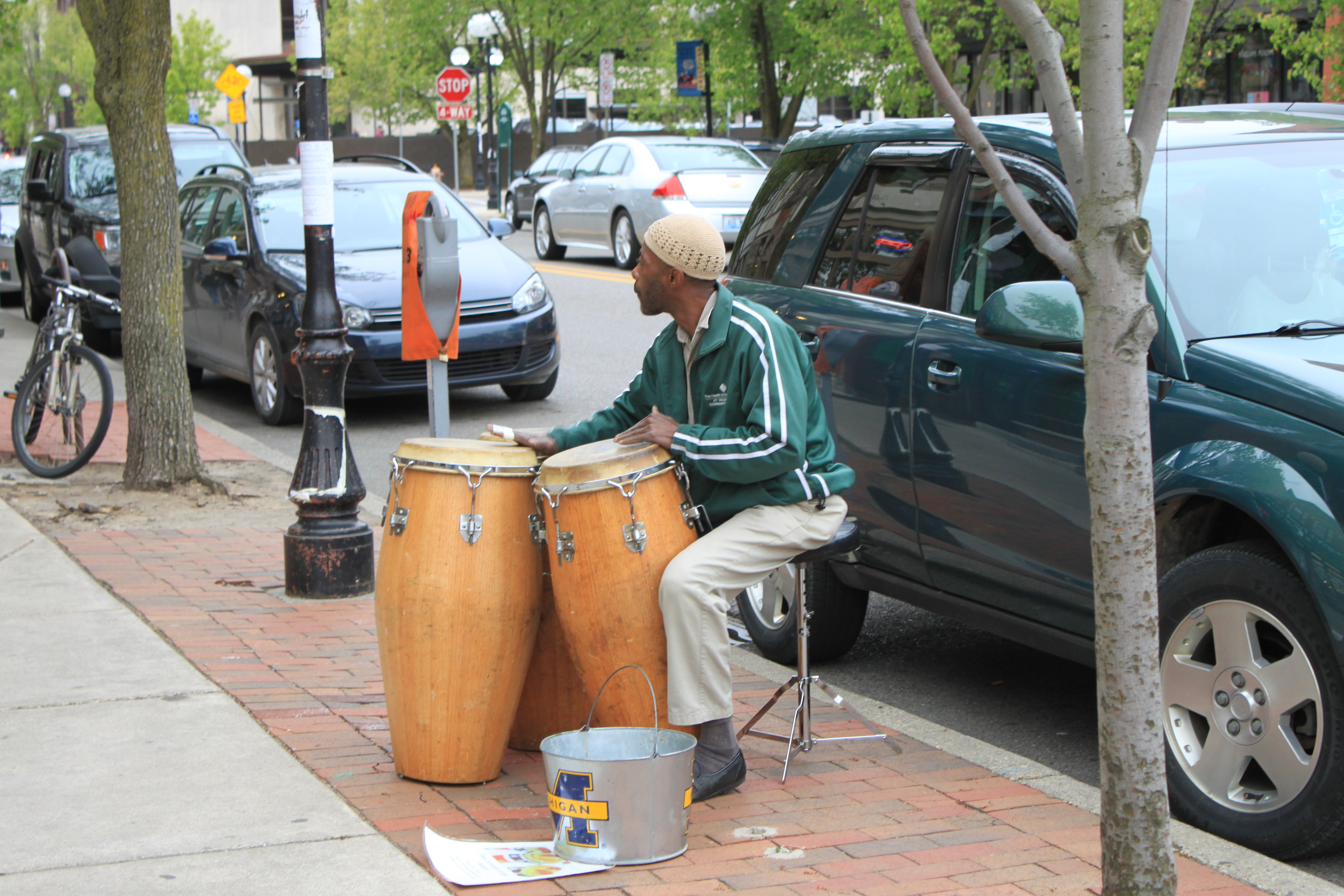
Street musician

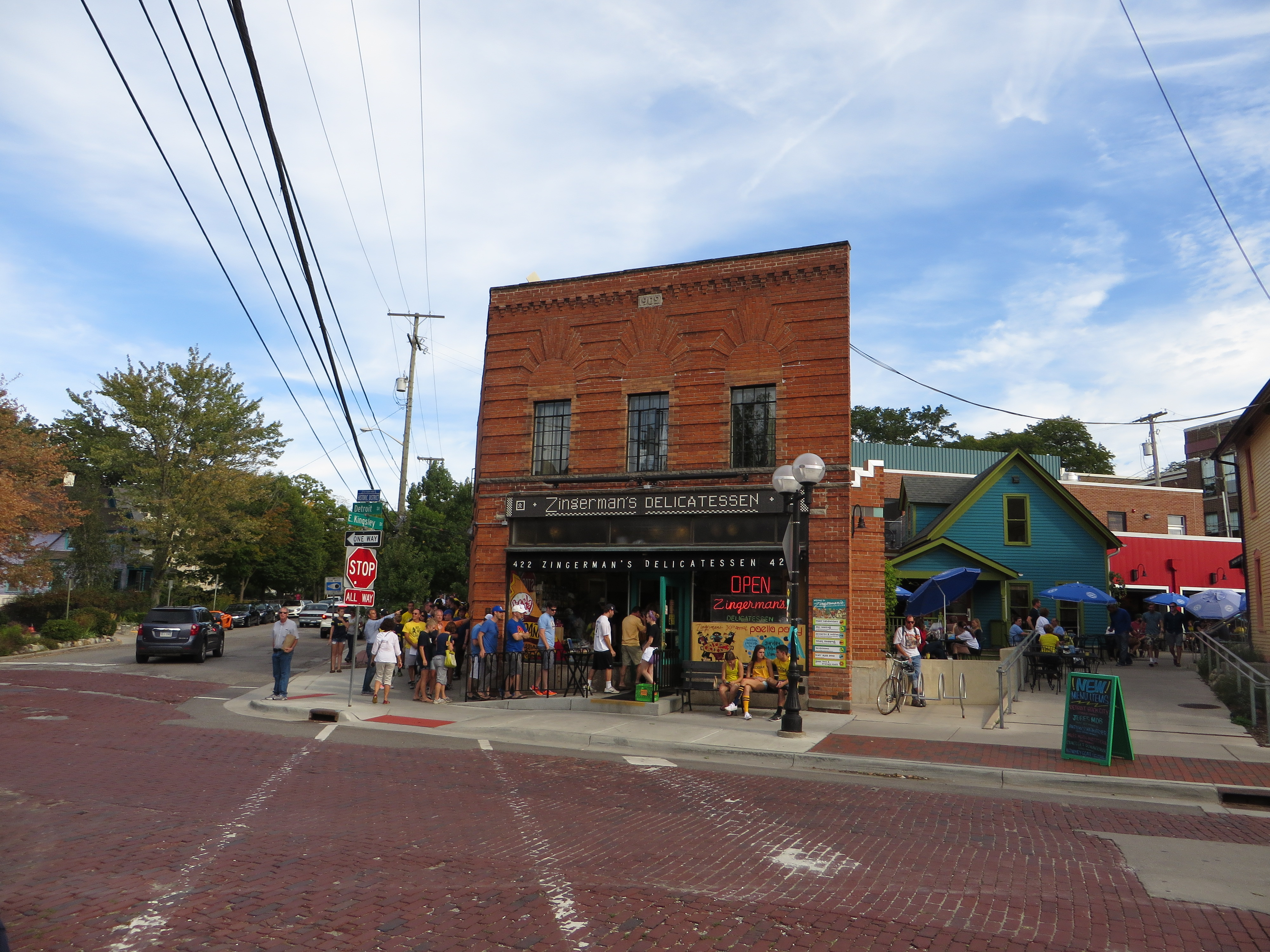
Zingerman's Deli
