= Youth Liberation of Ann Arbor =

American youth organization (1970–1979)

Youth Liberation of Ann Arbor was an organization based in Ann Arbor, Michigan. It existed from 1970 to 1979, and is often cited in more recent academic literature as one of the leading forerunners of several youth movements in the United States, including the youth rights movement, youth voice movement, and the youth media movement.

== History ==
The organization was founded by several Ann Arbor teenagers in December 1970, when the first draft of the Youth Liberation platform was written. and served as a principal informational and organizational hub for a host of similar efforts around the country. Its central aims included student control of education, the free development of youth culture, and an end to discrimination against youth, with related emphases on gay rights for young people, environmentalism, and an end to the Vietnam War. Youth Liberation also allied with older radicals in Ann Arbor- and Detroit-area organizations such as the White Panther Party and the Human Rights Party.

In the spring of 1971, its members successfully persuaded the Ann Arbor city council to drop its curfew laws. During the 1971–1972 school year, student unions were started in many schools in the Ann Arbor area.

In 1972, Youth Liberation's Sonia Yaco, a fifteen-year-old student, ran for the Ann Arbor School Board as a member of the local Human Rights Party. Regulations stipulated that only adults could run for school board, but Yaco's demands for a student voice in school governance earned her 1,300 votes as a write-in candidate, or eight percent of the total. Her campaign indirectly influenced the establishment of the experimental, alternative Community High School in Ann Arbor later that year.

== Publications ==
The group's publications arm, the Youth Liberation Press, began in 1969 as a separate entity known as CHIPS (Chicago area High school Independent Press Service). The acronym later changed to stand for Cooperative High School Independent Press Service, founded by John Schaller based in Chicago, Illinois. The news service was created to provide articles and graphics for high school papers (both official and underground) as well as to young people in general. After a short stint from 1970 to 1972 in Houston, Texas, where the press began publishing FPS, a news magazine for youth, the press moved to Ann Arbor and merged with Youth Liberation of Ann Arbor. An early issue of FPS lists its contributors as Liz Bell, Keith Hefner, Chuck Ream, John Schaller, and Sonia Yaco. In addition to FPS (later Magazine of Young People's Liberation), the press put out several collections of essays in book and pamphlet format, including:

- How to Start a High School Underground Newspaper (Chicago, IL: High School Independent Press, 1969).
- Youth Liberation: News, Politics and Survival Information (Washington, NJ: Times Change Press, 1972).
- High School Women's Liberation (Ann Arbor, MI: Youth Liberation Press, 1976).
- A Youth Liberation Pamphlet (Ann Arbor, MI: Youth Liberation Press, 1977).
- Growing Up Gay (Boston, MA: Carrier Pigeon, 1978).
- Keith Hefner, Children's Rights Handbook (Ann Arbor, MI: Youth Liberation Press, 1979).

Currently all pamphlets and issues of FPS published from 1970 through 1978 are available on the website www.youthliberation.com owned by Chuck Ream, one of the earliest contributors to the publication.

== Manifesto ==
The group's manifesto was reprinted in The Children's Rights Movement: Overcoming the Oppression of Young People, edited by Beatrice and Ronald Gross (Garden City, NY: Anchor Press/Doubleday, 1977), pp. 329–33.

YOUTH LIBERATION PROGRAM LIST OF WANTS -- "We must liberate ourselves from the death trip of corporate America."

1. We want the power to determine our own destiny.
2. We want the immediate end of adult chauvinism.
3. We want full civil and human rights.
4. We want the right to form our education according to our needs.
5. We want the freedom to form into communal families.
6. We want the end of male chauvinism and sexism.
7. We want the opportunity to create an authentic culture with institutions of our own making.
8. We want sexual self-determination. We believe all people must have the unhindered right to be heterosexual, homosexual, bisexual, or transsexual.
9. We want the end of class antagonism among young people.
10. We want the end of racism and colonialism in the United States and the world.
11. We want freedom for all unjustly imprisoned people.
12. We want the right to be economically independent of adults.
13. We want the right to live in harmony with nature.
14. We want to rehumanize existence.
15. We want to develop communication and solidarity with the young people of the world in our common struggle for freedom and peace.

== See also ==
- History of youth rights in the United States
- Youth-led media
- Keith Hefner
- Sonia Yaco
