= Mohamad Bazzi =

Lebanese-American journalist

- محمد بزي (Arabic)
- Born: October 1975 (age 50); Beirut, Lebanon
- Occupation: Journalist

Mohamad Bazzi (Arabic: محمد بزي; born October 1975) is a Lebanese-American journalist. He is the former Middle East bureau chief at Newsday and a current faculty member of New York University. He is currently director of the Hagop Kevorkian Center for Near Eastern Studies at New York University. From 2019 to 2021, he was the associate director of NYU's Journalism Institute. Bazzi was the 2007–2008 Edward R. Murrow Press Fellow at the Council on Foreign Relations. From 2009 to 2013, he served as an adjunct senior fellow for Middle East Studies at the Council on Foreign Relations. He is also currently a columnist for the Guardian US, writing on American foreign policy and corruption under Donald Trump's administration.

While at Newsday, Bazzi covered the Middle East, Afghanistan, and Pakistan, where he focused on militant Islamic movements, regional politics, and the war on terrorism. He established bureaus in Baghdad and Beirut, and was Newsday's lead writer on the Iraq War and its aftermath. He also covered the 2000 Palestinian uprising, the 2001 war in Afghanistan, and the 2006 war between Hezbollah and Israel.

== Biography ==
Mohamad Bazzi left his native Lebanon for the United States in 1985, when he was 10 years old. He began his journalism career in middle school writing for community newspapers in Queens. As a high school student he wrote more than 30 articles for New Youth Connections (now YCteen), New York's citywide magazine by and for teens published by Youth Communication. He became a United States citizen in 1994. He graduated magna cum laude in 1997 from Hunter College in New York City. Bazzi was born in Beirut, and his family is from the southern Lebanon town of Bint Jbeil. He came to the U.S. with an older brother; another brother is in France, yet another is in Spain, and their parents and a sister remain in Lebanon. English is Bazzi's third language; he learned both Arabic and French as a child in Lebanon, and English after he came to the United States. Bazzi became a staff writer for Newsday in 1998.

In ten years on staff at Newsday, he was a metro reporter in New York City and served as the paper's United Nations bureau chief. His articles and commentaries on the Middle East have also appeared in The New York Times, Foreign Affairs, The Atlantic, The Guardian, The Nation, London Review of Books, Boston Review, Politico Magazine, Reuters, and other publications. Among Bazzi's awards are the 2017 and 2016 National Headliner Awards; the 2016 first place award in online columns from the National Society of Newspaper Columnists; the 2008 Arthur Ross Award for distinguished reporting and analysis on foreign affairs; the 2008 American Academy of Religion Award for in-depth reporting on religion; the 2005 Elizabeth Neuffer Memorial Prize; the 2004 News Analysis Award from the Society of the Silurians; the 2004 James Aronson Award for social justice journalism; the 2003 Silver Medal from the United Nations Correspondents Association; and the 2002 Daniel Pearl Award for outstanding print reporting on South Asia.

== Awards ==
- 2026 Deadline Club award for opinion writing for a series of Guardian US columns
- 2026 Third Place, in special or feature column, National Headliner Awards, for Guardian US columns
- 2016 First Place Award in online columns from the National Society of Newspaper Columnists
- 2008 Arthur Ross Award for distinguished reporting and analysis on foreign affairs from the American Academy of Diplomacy
- American Academy of Religion Award for in-depth reporting on religion
- 2005 Elizabeth Neuffer Memorial Prize from the United Nations Correspondents Association
- James Aronson Award for social justice journalism from Hunter College
- 2002 Daniel Pearl Award for outstanding print reporting on South Asia from the South Asian Journalists Association
- Young Reporter of the Year Award from the New York Press Club
