= LA Youth =

Independent teen newspaper, 1988–2013

- Type: Student newspaper
- Founder: Donna C. Myrow
- Founded: 1988
- Ceased publication: 2013
- City: Los Angeles, California
- Circulation: 70,000

LA Youth was an independent newspaper by and for Los Angeles teens, published six times per year from January 1988 to January 2013. In 2002, it was the largest independent youth-led newspaper in the United States. It was distributed to more than 1,400 Los Angeles County public and private schools, libraries, and youth organizations. When it closed in 2013, it had a circulation of 70,000 and an audience of up to 400,000 readers. Student staff wrote personal essays and reported articles on topics that interested or impacted them, including controversial topics such as violence and mental illness. It was founded, edited, and published by Donna C. Myrow. Myrow established LA Youth in response to Hazelwood School District v. Kuhlmeier, a 1988 Supreme Court decision that allowed school officials to censor student newspapers.

== Editorial process ==
High school teenagers (grades 9–12) were the journalists, known as staff writers, who worked on each monthly publication. Eighth grade students who wanted to become involved could attend staff meetings and contribute to the paper.

The staff writers prepared each issue by attending Saturday staff meetings, held at the LA Youth office in the Fairfax District. At the meetings, staff writers met with the adult staff and newcomer students. Students and staff writers were encouraged to bring in friends and siblings, to broaden the number of students involved on the paper. The adult staff also recruited student writers from group homes, homeless shelters, and juvenile hall. They worked with social workers to find foster youth interested in writing about their experiences.

The meeting consisted of each writer/student presenting himself/herself to the rest of the students, such as what school he/she went to, what he liked to do for fun, and where he was planning to attend college. Students came from a wide range of schools and cities across the region, including both wealthy and poor neighborhoods. Each student was able to share their different opinions about school graduation requirements, recent police enforcement misconduct, crime and violence, and other controversial news.

After student presentations at the meeting, the adult staff asked whether current articles have been revised or finished. If any staff member was having an issue, he/she could share it with the group and receive support. Even sharing an issue could give another staff writer an idea to write an article. If the adult staff agreed it's an important issue to discuss, then the writer could begin brainstorming, find other interested writers, and write the article. Writers wrote in a range of styles, including first-person stories, news articles, political opinion pieces, and music reviews. Students could also contribute news photography and illustrations for articles.

Adult staff encouraged students to recognize the value of their ideas and helped them write about challenging topics in effective ways. Students were sometimes mentored by professors from the University of Southern California and journalists from the Los Angeles Times.

== Operations ==
The newspaper was operated by a nonprofit, Youth News Service of Los Angeles. The Los Angeles Times donated photography equipment, printing, and newsprint. Staff salaries, office rent, and other program costs were largely funded by philanthropic grants and corporate donations. Grants came from the James Irvine Foundation, Bank of America Foundation, Ethics and Excellence in Journalism Foundation, and other organizations. For example, it received grants to fund a satellite bureau at Locke High School in Watts, Los Angeles. The 2008 recession reduced available funding, eventually leading to the organization's closure in 2013. At the time it closed, it had an annual budget of about $500,000.

== Impact ==
In the 1990s, LA Youth was one of more than 20 youth-led media initiatives in the United States. It received national attention in 1990 for an article about police mistreatment of young people of color. In 2009, Youth Media Reporter described LA Youth as "one of the nation's oldest and most respected youth media programs", and noted that its student writers engaged with local public policy discussions.

A few student writers became professional journalists, but the primary goal of the organization was to give young people an opportunity to speak publicly about issues that affected them, rather than to prepare them for specific careers.

Along with issues of the newspaper, LA Youth distributed lesson plans to high school teachers to support teaching writing in an engaging way.

Archived issues are held in the special collections of the UCLA Library. Myrow wrote a book about LA Youth, titled Don’t Print That! Giving Teens the Power of the Press, published in 2021.

== See also ==
- Censorship of student media in the United States
- Youth voice
