= Extinction Rebellion Youth =

Youth environmental pressure group

- Named after: Anthropocene extinction
- Formation: February 2019; 7 years ago
- Founded at: United Kingdom
- Type: Advocacy group
- Purpose: Climate change mitigation Climate justice Social justice Nature conservation Environmental protection
- Region served: International
- Fields: Climate movement Conservation movement Environmental movement Youth activism
- Affiliations: Extinction Rebellion
- Website: xryouth.us

Extinction Rebellion Youth (abbreviated as XRY and shortened to XR Youth) is the autonomous youth wing of the global environmental movement Extinction Rebellion (XR), made up of activists under the age of 30. It has the stated aim of using nonviolent civil disobedience to compel government action to avoid tipping points in the climate system, biodiversity loss, and the risk of social and ecological collapse. XR Youth was established in the United Kingdom in February 2019 by a collective of young environmental activists from XR. In contrast to the rest of XR, the youth wing is more centred around climate justice and consideration of the Global South and indigenous peoples. As of September 2020, there are over 200 branches globally, including over 80 in the UK.

== History and structure ==
A youth wing—XR Youth—of Extinction Rebellion formed in February 2019. In contrast to the main XR, its main focus is centring the youth voice on topics around climate justice, in solidarity with youth in the Global South and indigenous peoples. By October 2019 there were 55 XR Youth groups in the UK and another 25 elsewhere. All XR Youth comprise people born after 1990, with an average age of 16, and some aged 10.

Similarly to the main XR, XRY is a loosely networked, decentralised, grassroots movement. XRY organises on both a local, national and international level, with each level of the organisation and each local group maintaining a relationship with their counterparts in main XR. Many activists are part of affinity groups, small groups of usually between 8 and 12 protesters to carry out and join actions.

== Actions in the United Kingdom ==
=== National actions ===
==== Southampton Oil Blockade ====
From around 4am on April 1, 2022, a group of XR Youth rebels blockaded the Esso Hythe Oil Refinery in Fawley, Southampton. Two activists locked themselves onto a pink boat which blockaded the entrance to the refinery for eight hours. The activists claimed they were holding ExxonMobil to account in the name of justice and solidarity for those most affected by the climate crisis, for the refinery workers (who went on strike a week later) and for the activists futures.

The group called for an end for new fossil fuel projects and the phasing out of the current system, particularly ExxonMobil's expanding of diesel production facilities and the laying of a large bore pipeline aiming to supply Heathrow Airport with greater quantities of fossil fuels.

Both activists were later arrested and held in Southampton Police Station.

==== G7 Cornwall Climate Summit ====
Approximately between June 10-13, 2021, around 60 XR Youth rebels traveled down to the G7 Climate Summit in Carbis Bay, Cornwall. They joined with XR in a series of peaceful protests around St Ives & Falmouth, urging the world leaders to take the action needed on the climate and ecological emergency. The group wanted to highlight that 2021 is a critical year for climate action, especially in the run up to COP26 which took place later that year in November in Glasgow.

=== Bristol ===
==== Clifton Suspension Bridge ====
On the evening of Thursday August 27, 2020, two members of local group XR Youth Bristol locked their arms together and lay down on the Clifton Suspension Bridge, blocking traffic and causing the police to seal off the bridge to all vehicles, cyclists and pedestrians. The two activists were both arrested shortly after 11pm on suspicion of wilful obstruction of the highway and conspiracy to cause a public nuisance. The action was part of a series of protests by XR advocating for the UK Parliament to pass the Climate and Ecological Emergency Bill. XRY Bristol then remained just off of the bridge to protest until Friday afternoon, but the police kept the bridge closed until Tuesday 1 September.

==== Summer Uprising ====
During XR UK's Summer Uprising of July 2019, members of XR Youth from across the South West occupied College Green and were joined by musician Billy Bragg. XRY also joined Bristol Youth Strike 4 Climate on a march around the city centre.

=== Cambridge ===
==== Rebel for Justice ====
From 16 to 23 February 2020, local group XR Youth Cambridge held a week-long roadblock on Trumpington Road at the Fen Causeway. Their environmental demands were aimed at University of Cambridge, Cambridge City Council, and Cambridgeshire County Council.

==== Trinity College ====
On 17 February 2020, members of main Extinction Rebellion and XR Youth dug up a lawn outside Trinity College to protest the college's role in plans for a development involving a lorry park at Innocence Farm, Suffolk.

==== Petrol stations ====
On Saturday 18 January 2020, XR Youth Cambridge shut down a BP petrol station on Elizabeth Way for a day long protest including music, dancing and pop-up art. A spokesperson for the group said they are not "blaming and shaming motorists", but instead "just asking them to address our concerns because it's just such an urgent issue." One older member of main XR was injured when a car drove into him.

On Friday 21 February 2020, members of XR Youth Cambridge set up a blockade of a Shell petrol station on Newnham Road to protest greenwashing by the company. The activists blocked any cars from entering by holding up a large banner displaying the message 'Life or Death.' Several activists climbed on top of the station's forecourt canopy to bear signs and notices. Furthermore, one protester poured molasses onto the shell logo from the roof, giving it the appearance of being coated in oil.

=== Oxford ===
==== Westgate Shopping Centre ====
On Friday 21 and Saturday 22 August 2020, local group XR Youth Oxford staged a protest at Westgate Shopping Centre against fast fashion. Actions included a die in, banner drops and speeches.

==== Black Friday 2019 ====
In response to Black Friday sales, Extinction Rebellion Youth Oxford staged an upcycled fashion catwalk to protest fast fashion.

=== London ===
In October 2019, XR Youth and XR Families violated a 'protest ban' by the Metropolitan Police and blockaded the UK headquarters of Google and its subsidiary YouTube, calling for them to stop donating to groups promoting climate denial. Members of XR Youth scaled to the top of the revolving doors of YouTube's offices and draped a banner reading: "YouTube Stop Platforming Climate Change Denial". An investigation by The Guardian had revealed the week before that Google had made substantial contributions to some of the most notorious climate deniers in Washington, despite its insistence that it supports action on the climate emergency.

== Actions elsewhere ==
=== Australia ===
On Saturday 10 April 2021, members of Extinction Rebellion Youth Australia participated in a national day of action 'to stop black deaths in custody'. Rallies were held in Sydney, Melbourne, Brisbane and Perth, protesting the Australian Government's failure to implement the changes recommended by the Royal Commission into Aboriginal Deaths in Custody.

==== Melbourne ====
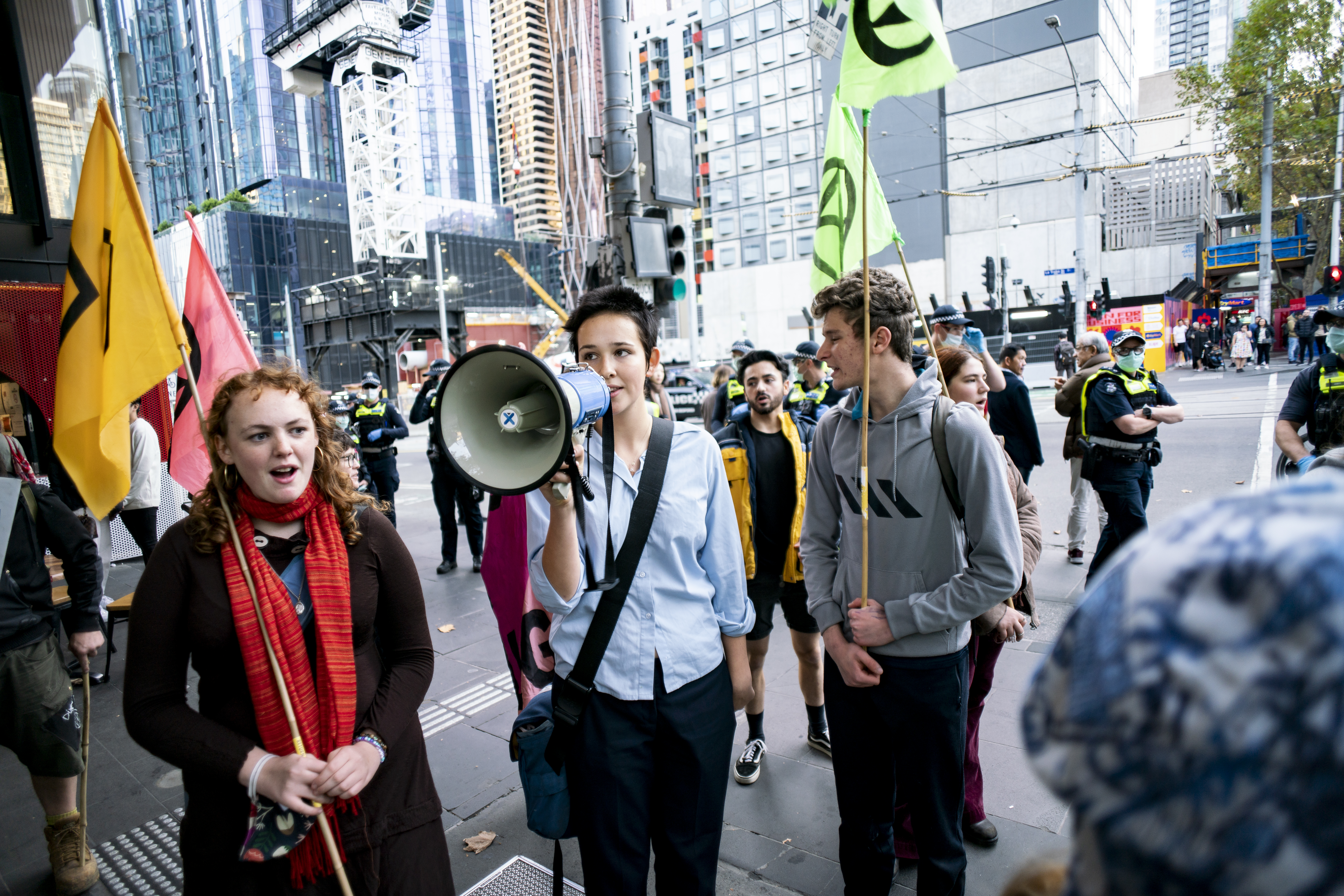
Extinction Rebellion Youth activists during an action in Melbourne, Australia on 28 April 2021

On Friday 26 March 2021, members of Extinction Rebellion Youth Melbourne blocked the West Gate Freeway using a six-metre-high metal tripod. They displayed a sign reading 'We refuse to be the last generation.' Police confirmed that a 17-year-old from Frankston would be charged with multiple counts including obstructing a roadway. The young person stated in an Instagram post: "When injustice is law, we have a responsibility to rebel against those unjust laws, to show our dissent to a broken system".

During Extinction Rebellion's Autumn Rebellion in Melbourne, on 27 March 2021, several hundred women and their supporters (including Extinction Rebellion Youth activists) marched through Melbourne's CBD to the front of Flinders Street Station as part of the Extinction Rebellion women's march - where several women then glued on at and occupied the Flinders and Swanston Street intersection. According to an Instagram post by Extinction Rebellion Youth Australia, one 17-year-old activist was arrested 'for refusing to move off the Flinders and Swanston Street intersection'. The young person was quoted as saying "How can we truly find justice when justice cannot be served to First Nations Peoples [...] and people of all genders?"

=== Brazil ===
==== Amazonas ====
On 23 September 2019, Extinction Rebellion Youth Brazil held a 'public class' in Manaus to share information about the climate crisis. They displayed signs reading 'NÃO HÁ PLANETA B!' ("No Planet B!") and 'EMERGÊNCA CLIMÁTICA' ("Climate Emergency").

==== Federal District ====
In September 2019, members of Extinction Rebellion Youth Brasil and Fridays for Future Brasil displayed a banner reading 'SOS AMAZONIA' at the Ministry of the Environment (Brazil).
