= Ann Arbor Public Schools =

School district in Michigan

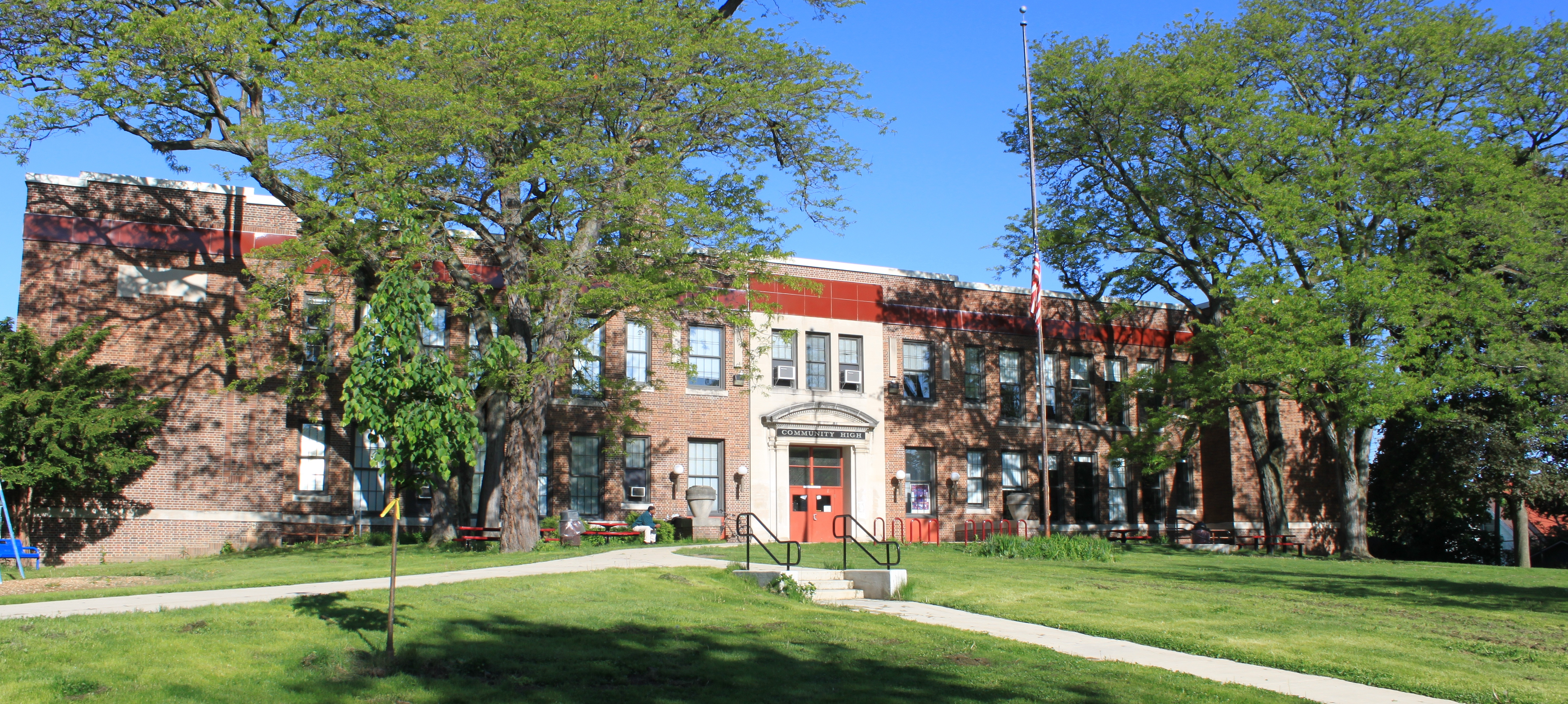
- Community High School in downtown Ann Arbor

Address
- 2555 S. State Street Ann Arbor, Washtenaw, Michigan, 48104; United States

District information
- Type: Public
- Motto: Lead. Care. Inspire.
- Grades: PreK–12
- Superintendent: Jazz Parks
- School board: 8 elected members
- Schools: 32
- Budget: $433,269,000 (2022-2023) expenditures
- NCES District ID: 2602820

Students and staff
- Students: 16,871 (2024-2025)
- Teachers: 1,131.74 FTE (2024-2025)
- Staff: 2,272.98 FTE (2024-2025)
- Student–teacher ratio: 14.91 (2024-2025)

Other information
- Website: www.a2schools.org

Ann Arbor Public Schools (AAPS) is a public school district in Washtenaw County, Michigan. It serves Ann Arbor and parts of the following townships: Ann Arbor Township, Lodi, Northfield, Pittsfield, Salem, Scio, Superior, and Webster.

== History ==
In 1825, the city's first public school opened. A union school district was organized in 1830 and a dedicated high school building was built in 1855 and opened on October 5, 1856.

The high school and its 1871 and 1889 additions were completely destroyed by fire on December 31, 1904. Some equipment, including the library books, were saved from the fire.

In 1908, a new high school building opened on the southeast corner of Huron and State Street. The building was replaced by Ann Arbor Pioneer High School in 1956 and bought by University of Michigan. It was torn down in 2007.

In 1922 and 1923, the oldest schools still in use by the district were built: Bach, Angell, and Burns Park Elementaries, Mack School (now Ann Arbor Open School), and Jones Elementary (now Community High School). Ann Arbor High School moved and remained known as Ann Arbor High on Stadium Boulevard. It was renamed Pioneer High in 1967 when Huron High was started. There was no Ann Arbor Pioneer High until then. When Pioneer High School opened in 1956,(error) it was still the only high school in the district. It was designed by the Cleveland architecture firm Fulton, Krinsky and Delamontte. It was so impressive that a reporter for the Associated Press called it "a high school to end all high schools."

Huron High School, designed by architecture firm Lane, Riebe, Weiland, opened in September 1969. Skyline High School opened in fall 2008. The architect was TMP Associates.

In 2015, Washtenaw County Circuit Judge Carol Kuhnke ruled that the Ann Arbor district can continue banning guns on its campus properties.

In 2019, voters in the district passed a $1 billion bond issue to improve district facilities.

== Schools ==
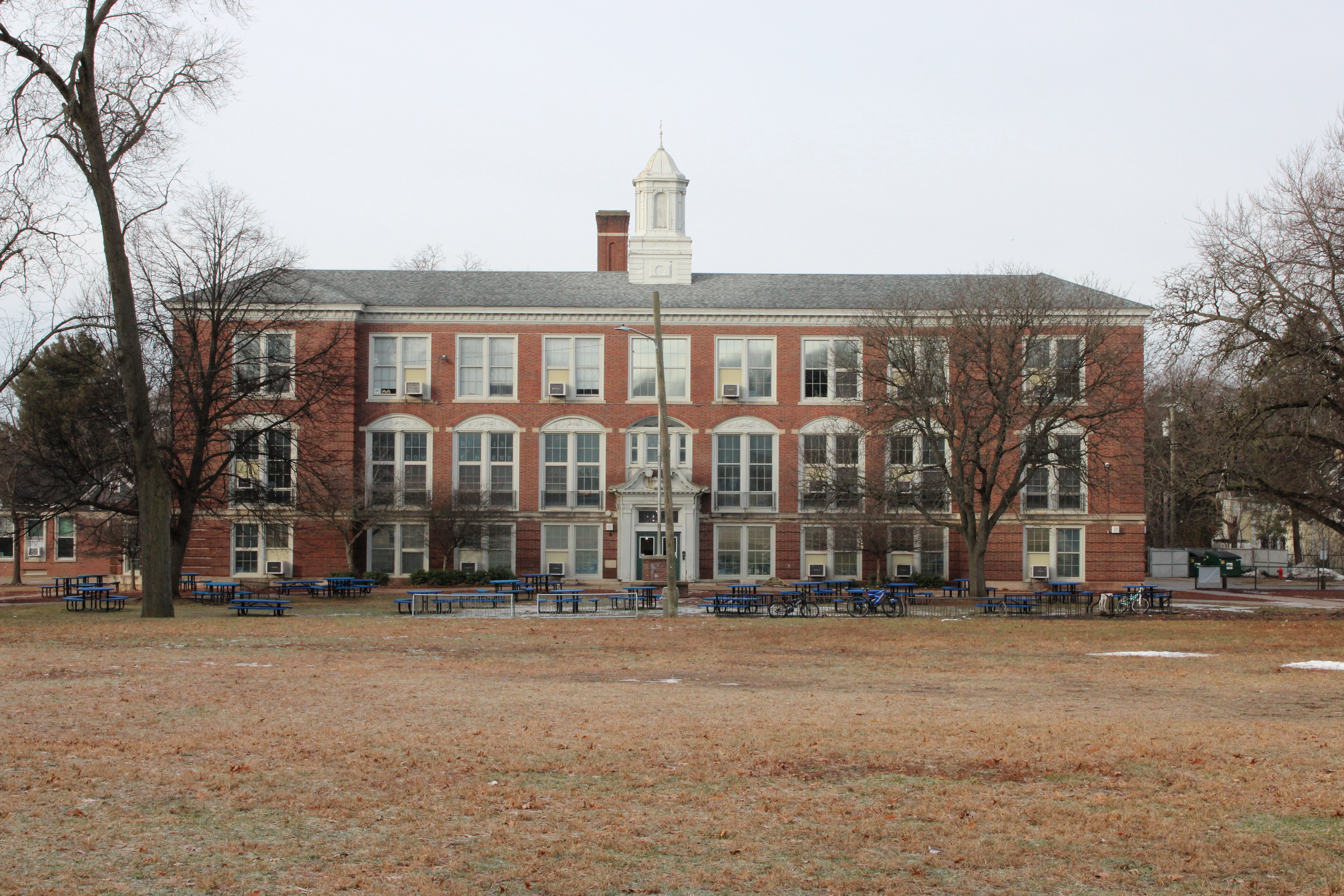
Burns Park Elementary School

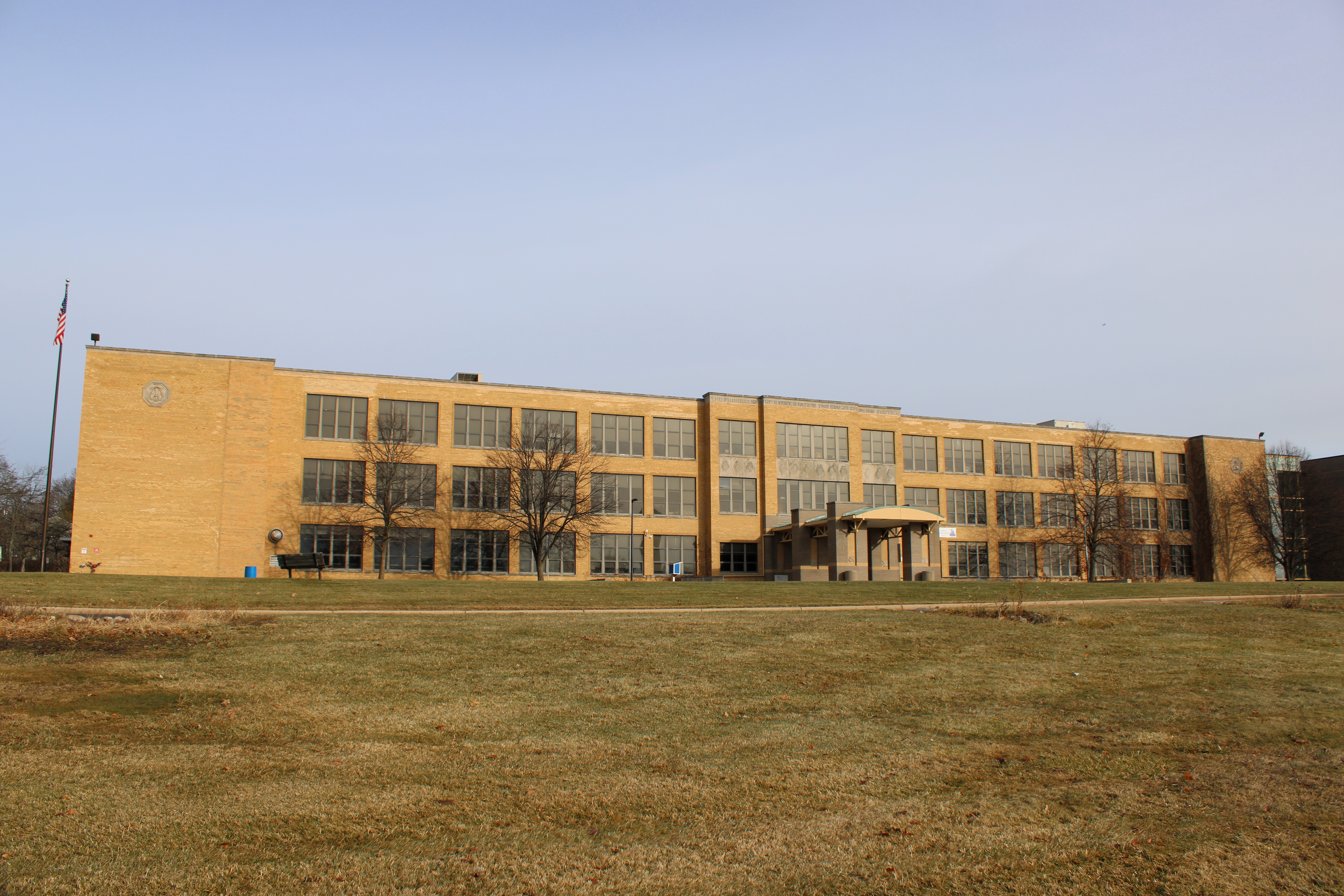
Tappan Middle School

List of schools in Ann Arbor Public Schools district
| School | Address | Built | Notes |
Elementary schools (Grades K-5)
| Abbot Elementary | 2670 Sequoia Parkway, Ann Arbor | 1962 | |
| Allen Elementary | 2560 Towner Blvd, Ann Arbor | 1961 | |
| Angell Elementary | 1608 S. University, Ann Arbor | 1923 | |
| Bach Elementary | 600 Jefferson W, Ann Arbor | 1922 | |
| Bryant Elementary | 2150 Santa Rosa, Ann Arbor | 1973 | |
| Burns Park Elementary | 1414 Wells, Ann Arbor | 1923 | |
| Carpenter Elementary | 4250 Central Blvd, Ann Arbor | 1953 | |
| Dicken Elementary | 2135 Runnymede, Ann Arbor | 1957 | |
| Eberwhite Elementary | 800 Soule Blvd, Ann Arbor | 1950 | |
| Haisley Elementary | 825 Duncan, Ann Arbor | 1954 | |
| King Elementary | 3800 Waldenwood Dr., Ann Arbor | 1969 | |
| Lakewood Elementary | 344 Gralake, Ann Arbor | 1961 | |
| Lawton Elementary | 2250 S Seventh St, Ann Arbor | 1963 | |
| Logan Elementary | 2685 Traver Blvd, Ann Arbor | 1977 | |
| Mitchell Elementary | 3550 Pittsview Dr, Ann Arbor | 1951 | |
| Pattengill Elementary | 2100 Crestland, Ann Arbor | 1957 | |
| Pittsfield Elementary | 2543 Pittsfield, Ann Arbor | 1944 | |
| Thurston Elementary | 2300 Prairie, Ann Arbor | 1963 | |
| Wines Elementary | 1701 Newport, Ann Arbor | 1960 | |
Middle Schools (Grades 6-8)
| Clague Middle School | 2616 Nixon Rd, Ann Arbor | 1972 | |
| Forsythe Middle School | 1655 Newport Rd, Ann Arbor | 1960 | |
| Scarlett Middle School | 3300 Lorraine Ave, Ann Arbor | 1968 | |
| Slauson Middle School | 1019 Washington W, Ann Arbor | 1937 | |
| Tappan Middle School | 2251 Stadium Blvd, Ann Arbor | 1950 | |
High Schools (Grades 9-12)
| Huron High School | 2727 Fuller Rd, Ann Arbor | 1969 | |
| Pioneer High School | 601 Stadium Blvd W, Ann Arbor | 1856 | |
| Skyline High School | 2552 N Maple Rd, Ann Arbor | 2008 | |
| Pathways to Success Academic Campus | 2800 Stone School Rd, Ann Arbor | 1949 | |
| Community High School | 401 Division N, Ann Arbor | 1922 | |
Other Schools
| Ann Arbor STEAM | 912 Barton Dr, Ann Arbor | 1939 | Previously Northside Elementary; K–8 |
| Ann Arbor Open School | 920 Miller, Ann Arbor | 1923 | Grades K–8 |
| A2 Virtual+ | | | Online learning platform |
| Westerman Preschool and Family Center | 2775 Boardwalk, Ann Arbor | 1990 | |

== Controversies ==
Despite being ranked as having some of the best schools in America, AAPS has not been without controversy.

=== 2020 civil rights complaint ===
In 2020, a black student at Pioneer High School filed a complaint with the Michigan Department of Civil Rights alleging racism in Ann Arbor schools. The filing came after an earlier petition from the school's Black Student Union requesting the teacher's dismissal. In October, a local group protested in front of the school demanding action against the teacher. The school system hired its own attorney to perform an independent investigation of the allegations. The next year, a parent filed a Freedom of Information Act lawsuit against AAPS, claiming they withheld documents that would provide evidence of racial discrimination at the high school and uncover the teacher's history of racial antagonism.

=== 2023 student abuse cover up scandal ===
In July of 2023, local media began reporting that a school aide had assaulted a 7-year-old student on an AAPS school bus. The aide was convicted of child abuse, but a lawsuit from the family alleged that the school covered up the abuse. By September, superintendent Jeanice Swift had resigned, and in October interim superintendent Jazz Parks was appointed by the Ann Arbor Board of Education.

=== 2024 Gaza ceasefire resolution ===
On January 18, 2024, Ann Arbor Public Schools approved a resolution that called for a ceasefire in Gaza, due to the Gaza war while also "encouraging its teachers to discuss the conflict" in classrooms. The approval came after 120 people gave commentary both in support, and opposition, of the resolution.
