= Youth-led media =

Media created and managed by young people

Youth-led media is any effort created, planned, implemented, and reflected upon by young people in the form of media, including websites, newspapers, television shows and publications. Originating in the 20th century alongside youth activism, efforts have been highly influenced in the 21st century by the introduction of social media.

== History ==
=== 20th century ===
Early efforts formed the basis of an international movement born in the early 1970s in Ann Arbor, Michigan, U.S. by the publishing arm of a left-wing, teen-led organization called Youth Liberation of Ann Arbor, which existed from 1970 to 1980. One of its founders went on to form the New York City-based Youth Communication, a youth-led media program for young people in foster care. Another organization in the early movement was Children's Express, which operates programs around the world.

After Hazelwood School District v. Kuhlmeier, a 1988 Supreme Court decision that allowed school officials to censor student newspapers, Donna C. Myrow established LA Youth as an independent student newspaper in Los Angeles, California.

In the early 1990s this movement gained new expression in the United States in response to growing media bias against youth, i.e. the hyper-sensationalization of youth violence ala "superpredators", and continued to grow due to the "Columbine" shootings. The first online, teen-written newspaper, The Tattoo, began in 1994 with a promise of giving voice to teens. This movement features hundreds of individuals and organizations working across the United States to promote the roles of young people in society and in the media. Demonstrating the wide reach of youth-led media a program in Oakland, California called Youth Radio has been featured across national media outlets in the U.S., including NPR and PBS. Other examples include the Blunt Youth Radio Project, which provides an hour-long, weekly, youth-produced public affairs radio show on WMPG in Portland, Maine, and The Global Youth Review, an international literary magazine dedicated to amplifying youth voices.

=== 21st century ===
The 2000s introduced youth-led media programs and organizations internationally, including Central and South America, Africa, Europe, and Australia.

A general interest magazine called Nang! was founded in 2001 and produced and distributed on a quarterly basis to 14- to 21-year-olds in London. Speak Africa is a Pan-African youth-produced multi-media communication initiative that works in print, radio, TV, the Internet and community theatre, and the Vera Project is an all-ages, non-profit youth music organization in Seattle, Washington. Coal Cracker youth-led news based in Mahanoy City, Pennsylvania, is a quarterly newspaper and website with content by young journalists from 12–18 years old.

In the United Kingdom, the BBC Young Reporter (formerly BBC News School Report) provides schools with the opportunity to host their own News Day in which students write news articles and interview people for a day. A student-led magazine named DGSChapter is produced by students of Dartford Grammar School who participate in the national scheme. National awards such as the Shine School Media Awards promote youth-led media as students compete for awards in a plethora of categories.

In 2009, the first Youth-Led Media Summit took place in the United Kingdom, which included personalities from various youth magazines, newspapers, radio, TV and digital media groups.

In the 2020s, the rise of social media, especially during the COVID-19 pandemic, allowed for many youth to create media content and raise awareness. Often, young people, including teenagers, create internet memes on social networking services such as Instagram. Some youth-led filmmaking have also been influenced by the pandemic. Teenage-led media organizations, such as Cripple Media, are commonly marketed as being "by and for" young people. Through social media marketing, projects are often dedicated to Generation Z, such as GEN-ZiNE.

== See also ==
- Youth voice
- Youth empowerment
