= Skyline High School (Michigan) =

Public high school in Ann Arbor, Michigan, United States

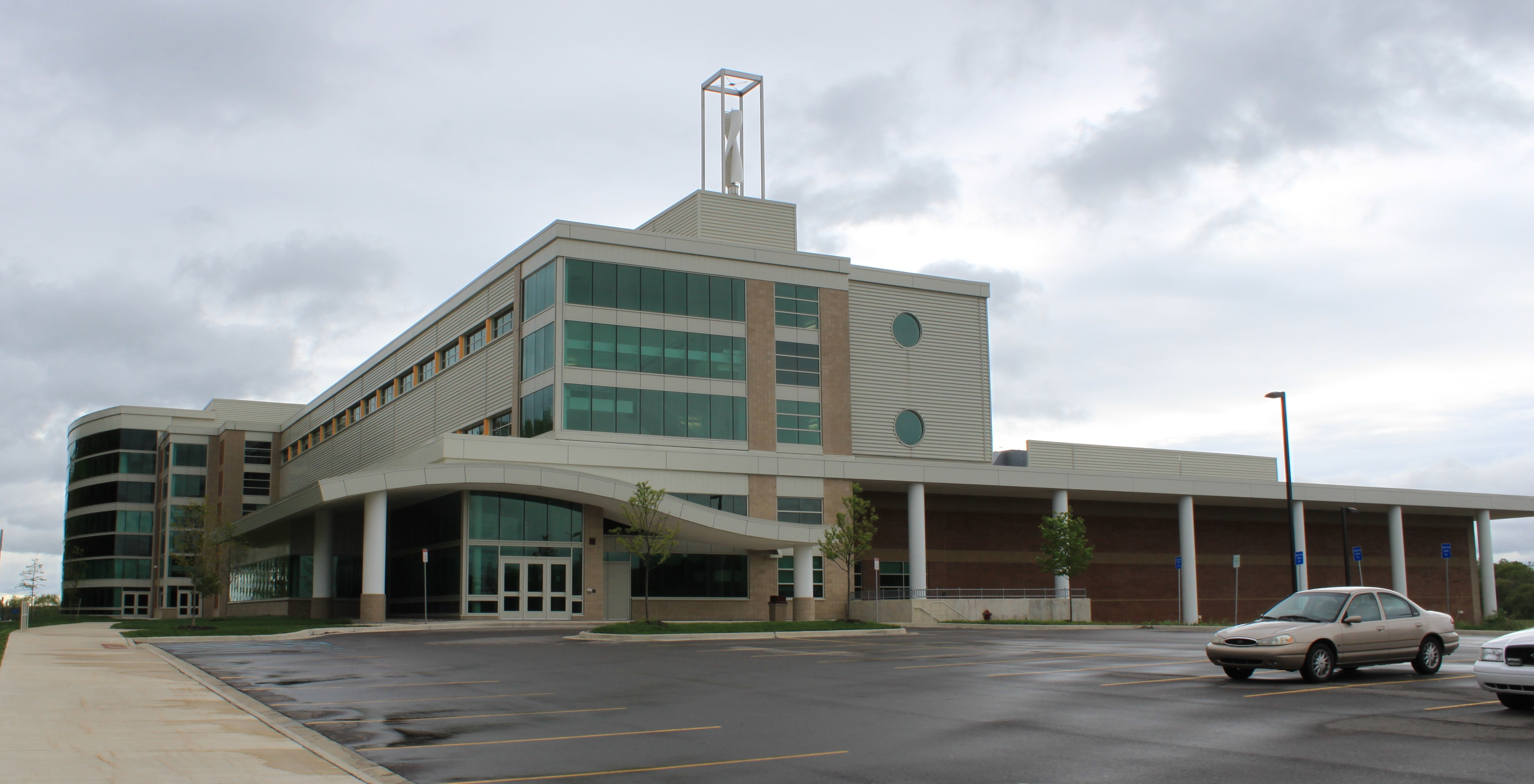

Location
- 2250 North Maple Road; Ann Arbor, Michigan 48103; United States
- 42°18′18″N 83°46′40″W

Information
- School type: Public, magnet high school
- Established: September 2, 2008
- School district: Ann Arbor Public Schools
- Superintendent: Jazz Parks
- CEEB code: 230089
- NCES School ID: 260282007761
- Principal: Casey Elmore
- Teaching staff: 84.35 (on an FTE basis)
- Grades: 9–12
- Enrollment: 1,271 (2023-2024)
- Student to teacher ratio: 15.07
- Campus type: Suburban
- Colors: Sky blue and white
- Nickname: Eagles
- Website: School website

Student assessments
- 2021–22 school year Change vs. prior year

M-STEP 11th grade proficiency rates (Science / Social Studies)
- Advanced %: 43.2 / 27.7
- Proficient %: 23.9 / 35.8
- PR. Proficient %: 13.2 / 29.4
- Not Proficient %: 19.7 / 7.1

Average test scores
- SAT Total: 1118.4 (▼ −70.1)

Skyline High School is a public, magnet high school in Ann Arbor, Michigan. The school opened in Fall 2008 with the intention to relieve overcrowding of the two existing high schools: Huron High School and Pioneer High School.

== History ==
Skyline High School opened in Fall 2008 as the third primary high school and fifth total high school in the Ann Arbor Public Schools system. Construction on the new school began in April 2005 following the approval of a $240 million bond in June 2004. As construction was beginning, a population of silvery salamanders was found on the site. A lawsuit was filed to block construction on the site due to the salamanders' presence, but the lawsuit was dropped the following month and construction was allowed to continue. As a result of the salamanders' presence, 57 of the 109 acres of the school's property were set aside as a wildlife preserve.

== Extracurricular activities ==
=== Athletics ===
Skyline High School is a member of the Michigan High School Athletic Association (MHSAA). They are part of the Southeastern Conference ("SEC") in the Red division. Skyline High School has teams in the following sports:

- boys' and girls' swim & dive
- boys' and girls' crew
- boys' football
- boys' and girls' cross country
- girls' pom pon
- boys' and girls' soccer
- boys and girls' basketball
- boys' and coed wrestling
- girls' volleyball
- boys' and girls' water polo
- boys' and girls' lacrosse
- boys' and girls' tennis
- boys' and girls' track
- softball
- baseball
- coed equestrian
- boys' and girls' golf
- coed figure skating
- girls' gymnastics
- boys' and girls' bowling
- boys' and girls' hockey
- girls' field hockey
- coed pickleball (club sport)

== Notable alumni ==
- Hobbs Kessler, 2023: middle-distance runner
- Marc Ybarra, 2016: Soccer Player
- Daelin Hayes, 2016: NFL Linebacker
- Andrew Copp, 2012: Professional NHL Center
