= Youth activism =

Youth engagement in community organizing for social change

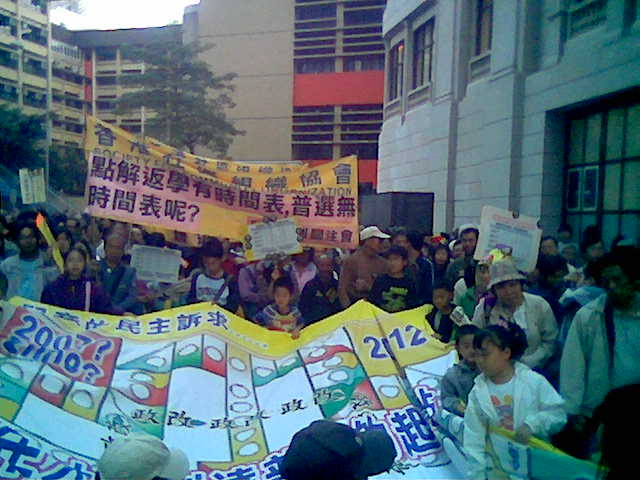
Child and youth activists protesting at a demonstration in Hong Kong in December 2005

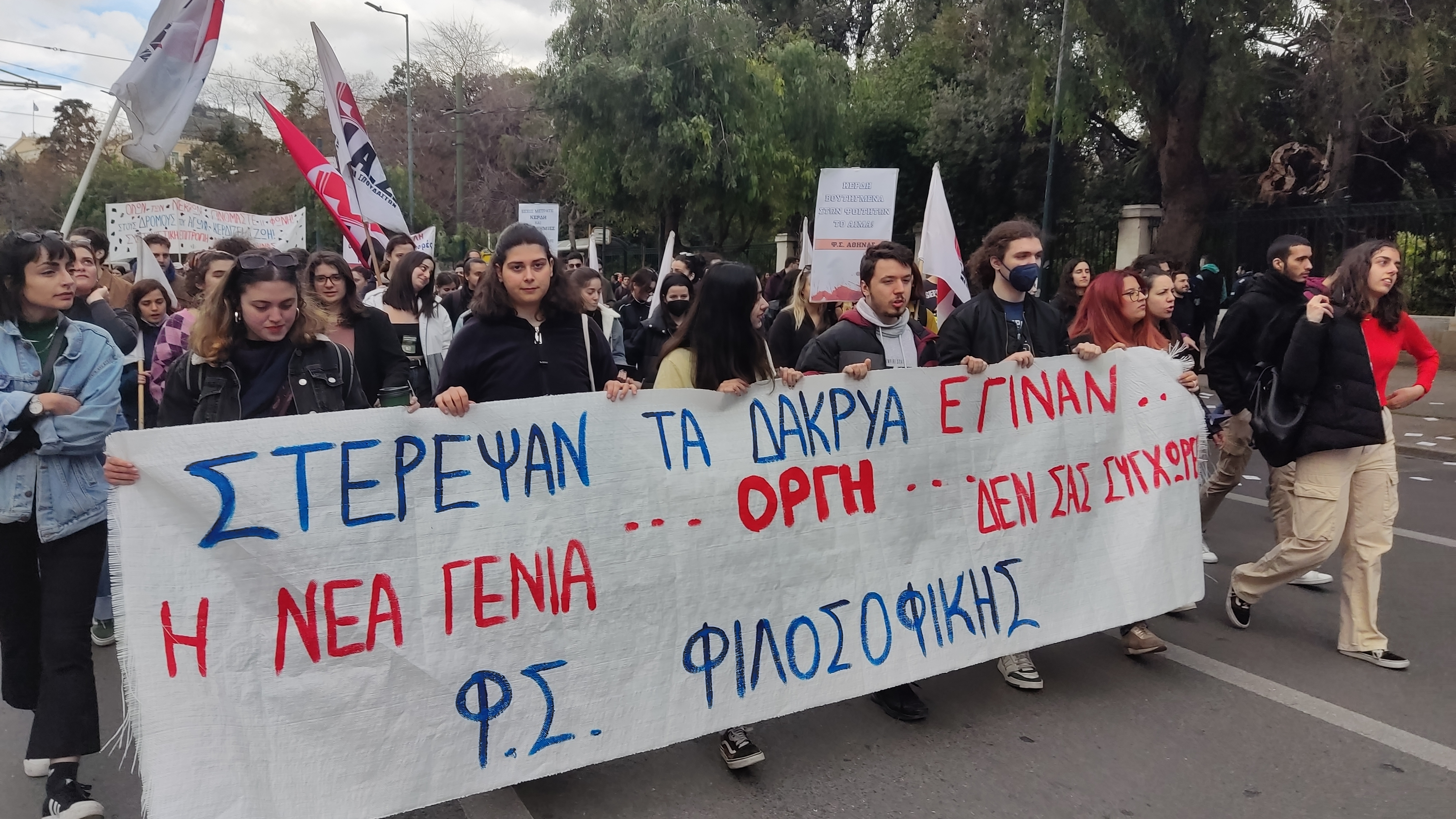
Students in a demonstration for the Tempi rail crash in Greece, 2023

Youth activism is the participation in community organizing for social change by persons between the ages of 15–24. Increasing youth activism has led to evolutions in young people's political participation, which includes activism. A notable shift within youth activism is the rise of "alter-activism" resulting in an emphasis on lived experiences and connectivity amongst young activists. Young activists have taken lead roles in public protest and advocacy around many issues like climate change, racism, gender, abortion rights and gun violence.

Different from past protest or advocacy, technology has become vital to many modern youth movements. It has been shown in multiple studies that internet use along with seeking information online is shown to have positive impacts on political engagement. Popular applications like Twitter, Instagram and YouTube have become the newest tools for young activists in the 21st century. Technology and the use of digital media has changed the way youth participate in activism globally, and youth are more active in media than older generations.

== Overview ==
Youth involvement in politics has risen in the 2010s and 2020s. Youth is an elastic category, the age at which it begins and ends varies within cultural contexts, but it is often considered a distinct stage in a person's life to which particular issues or policies are highly relevant. These may include politics, education, health, and social issues.

Sociopolitical development is a "psychological process that covers the range of cognitions, skills, attitudes, worldviews, and emotions that support social and political action". The process of SPD was further defined by Watts & Flannagan to impact young people's social analysis, worldview and sense of agency and to provide them opportunity structures and support towards their societal involvement behavior."

Social activism is the predominant form of youth activism today, as millions of young people around the world participate in social activism that is organized, informed, led, and assessed by adults. Many efforts, including education reform, children's rights, and government reform call on youth to participate this way, often called youth voice. Youth councils are an example of this.

Youth-driven activism requires young people to be the primary movers within an adult-led movement. Such is the case with the Sierra Club, where youth compel their peers to join and become active in the environmental movement. This is also true of many organizations that were founded by youth who became adults, such as SEAC and National Youth Rights Association.

Political activism by youth can go unnoticed because youth activism often occurs on school grounds and away from the adult society, but youth often face resistance when forming youth activist groups in schools. As the central beneficiaries of public schools, youth are also advocating for student-led school change and education reform through student activism and meaningful student involvement. While some youth participate in student government, others prefer student unions because they provide a real voice to the students and present it to the administration while student governments do not have the power to effect real change in a school system.

== Technology ==
=== Social media ===
Facebook has become a tool for youth activists to gather information, post broadcasts about events and activities, participate in activists' groups, and get in contact with other activists. The ability to create events on Facebook has allowed young activists to gather in spaces in a short period of time, and to communicate any changes in the event.

Twitter has become one of the most important tools to engage with and mobilize around issues of social justice and civil rights. Twitter has many different features on the application that have been used by young activists to spread their dissent. Like many other apps, Twitter has a live-streaming feature that was particularly important in movements like the Arab Spring or the Occupy movement. Live-streaming was not the only powerful tool on Twitter—hashtags have changed the landscape of online youth activism. For many modern movements, it was the hashtag that catapulted many groups into the mainstream media. For example, in the span of 5 years, the hashtag #BlackLivesMatter has been shared over 30 million times just on Twitter. By capitalizing on the power and popularity of a hashtag, these young activists have been able to have an even larger conversation about police brutality and the inherent racism in American systems. #BlackLivesMatter was not the only major movement to take Twitter by storm in recent years. In October 2017, the #Metoo movement took Twitter by storm and in just the first week it is estimated that these personal stories reach 6 to 37 million Twitter users. The anonymity of Twitter allowed women to share their personal stories of abuse with less fear and these personal stories helped amplify the movement.

While Twitter has provided a platform for hashtag movements to take place, applications like Facebook and Twitter have been criticized for only instilling weak ties between activists creating a lack of offline activism. The result of these weak ties has been the formation of slacktivism—a new ineffective form of activism. A popular example of slacktivism is the social media campaign Kony 2012. While this campaign did gain strong social media traction with millions of views on their video, they failed to gain the same offline traction. A year later when they released Kony in 2013, they did get the same traction. This is just one example of the slacktivism that can result from these applications.

=== Vlogging ===
Video blogging (a.k.a. vlogging) has become an essential part of how people communicate online especially on applications like Instagram, YouTube, Snapchat and even TikTok. This power of sharing videos and images can specifically be seen on Instagram. Instagram has allowed activists to do things like stream their protests live to viewers across the world. Live streaming is not the only powerful part of Instagram. Instagram has become an application for participants to gain social capital and even make a living off of their online activity. This creation of the "influencer" has allowed a rise in representation of minority communities as well as created an online community for them. The concept of the "influencer" is not the only way Instagram has shaped the political sphere. Instagram has also given a platform to share visuals that have allowed people to form their "political selves" through this application. This ability to share political visuals were most important in the 2014 Scottish independence referendum, and the 2015 UK general election. Overall, like many other applications, Instagram has provided large worldwide views that could lead to large-scale activism.

Video blogging may be used by youth activists as a tool to reach out to their peers and audience, gather support, establish a discourse, and mobilize others. Young activists use videos to articulate ideas and needs, organize resources and supporters, and work toward achieving the goals and causes of their supporters.

YouTube has allowed activists to exit the dangerous echo chamber that can be created online. By breaking free from this echo chamber, young YouTube activists and organization have been able to have a larger conversation about their issues. YouTube has given a platform for "vloggers" to not only document their life, but also have personal (and political) conversations with a large audience all from home. Vlogging has become very popular in youth activism including the Arab Spring. In the start of the Arab Spring, Asmaa Mahfouz from Egypt posted a vlog that eventually spread across YouTube. Many believe that this vlog was one factor that helped spark the revolution that took place in Egypt in 2011. Like the Arab Spring, videos (in particular YouTube) played a very important role in the Occupy Movement as well in 2011. Having YouTube allowed protestors to share videos of police abuse, but also share things like music videos to provide solidarity and morale.

=== Indymedia ===
Independent Media Center, also known as Indymedia, is a recent development that has helped involve youth into social movement activism. It has also led to the recognition of youth as political actors in the public domain.

== Global youth activism ==
Youth activism in the Global South increased in the first years of the 2010s. People under the age of 18 comprise 46% of the global population, and these youth played a crucial role around the world during the first two decades of the twenty-first century.

=== Africa ===
==== South Africa ====
A classic example of youth engagement in political activism is the Soweto riots. When teachers started instructing in Afrikaans, the language of their oppressors, children took the streets for a peaceful demonstration. The police reaction was brutal and on June 16, 1976, at least 25 people were killed. The violence continued and spread all across the country. By the end of the year, 575 people had died and 2,389 had been wounded.

=== Asia ===
==== India ====
In India, youth born in the 1980s and 1990s comprise part of a middle class increasingly vocal against impunity for rapists and against government corruption.

==== Indonesia ====
Youth activism in Indonesia takes many different forms and include a number of mass protests to overthrow governments and remove colonial powers in the past. Popular motivations of youth activism in Indonesia are indigenous rights and national unity, pro-communism, anticommunism, pro-democracy and militant Islam. A common form of activism is massa, a cavalcade of motorcycles, trucks, music, and many young people on foot. These cavalcades are mostly males and end with a rally to address a certain political issue. In general, youth have been looking for political change during the last four decades.

==== Malaysia ====
Video blogging has become increasing popular in Malaysia. Youth activists upload their videos and independent films to the popular site EngageMedia. This is used by Malaysians to encourage young people to become citizen journalists. Youth view EngageMedia as a safe space for their video blogs, but there is still fear of retribution.

==== Nepal ====
The 1979 student protests in Nepal were a series of protests amongst the student community in Nepal during the months of April and May 1979. The clashes that occurred had a significant historical impact, as they forced the monarchy to concede to holding a referendum on the possibility of a multiparty system in the country. Official figures stated that 11 persons were killed during the agitation, and 164 wounded.

Youth and Student organisations such as Nepal Student Union, ANNFSU and Nepal Tarun Dal are key forces behind protests and demonstration against authoritarian governments. Youths have been standing in the forefront in 1951, 1980, 1990 and 2005 democratic movements.

==== The Philippines ====
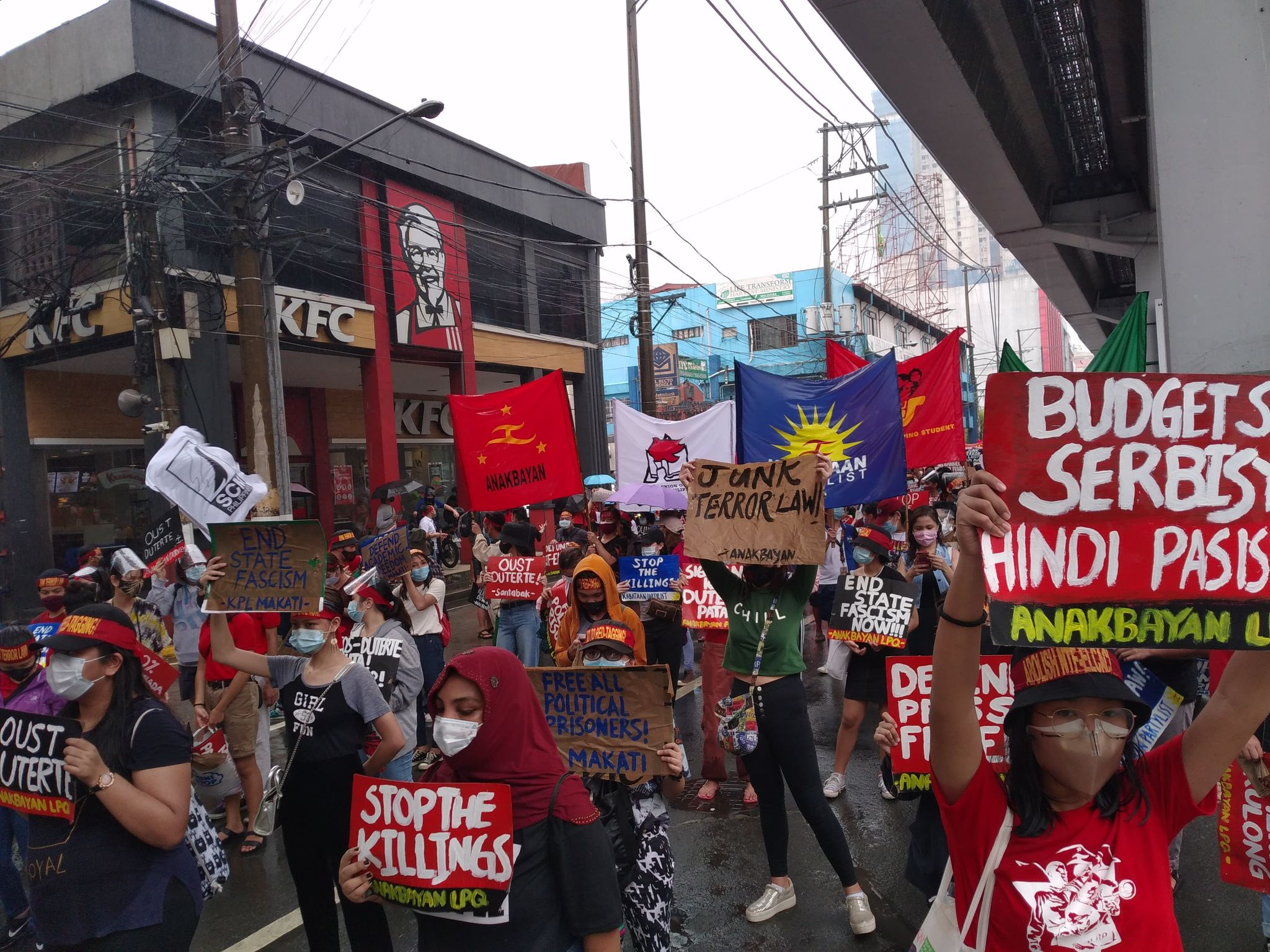
Youth national democratic mass organizations during International Human Rights Day, December 10, 2021

Youth activism has had a long history in the Philippines. The original founding members of the Katipunan as well as the Propaganda Movement consisted of youths. The country's national hero, Jose Rizal was martyred aged 35. In 1964, aiming to continue the revolutionary tradition of the Katipunan, the Kabataang Makabayan was formed against the Marcos regime. It became an underground organization in 1972 after the declaration of Martial Law but continues to organize in this manner. Other organizations campaigned against the Martial Law as well, such as League of Filipino Students, National Union of Students of the Philippines, Student Christian Movement of the Philippines, and College Editors Guild of the Philippines. In 1960, the SCMP was formed, rallying thousands of church youth against the Marcos regime. The LFS was formed on September 11, 1977, as an alliance against tuition fee increases. Eventually it became a mass organization of students campaigning against the fascist dictatorship. Around the 60s, the NUSP dominated the scene of student activism and aided in the various student council mobilizations across the country. In 1997, leaders from these organizations would eventually form ANAKBAYAN, a comprehensive mass organization of the Filipino youth, turning to combine both organizing students and community youth.

Known youth groups currently in operation are Liberal Youth, Kabataan Partylist, Akbayan Youth, Youth Reform Movement Philippines, and Samahan ng Progresibong Kabataan.

==== Singapore ====
Singapore is one of the most developed information and communication technology (ICT) countries in the world. In 2010 the computer ownership rate was 84 percent, with internet access at 78 percent. In 2009, mobile phone penetration reached 137 percent, meaning many people of Singapore have access to more than one phone.

Youth use ICT for social and political purposes. In the 2011 general election, people between the ages of 21 and 34 were more active in online politics. Youth who wrote about elections on blogs, Facebook or Twitter were at 28 percent, while the general public were only 10 percent.

=== Middle East ===
==== Egypt ====
Youth proved to be central to the Egyptian Revolution and the April 6 Movement.

==== Iran ====
Young adults in Iran defy the official regime's cultural and political policies through engaging in prohibited activities in places like taxi rides, coffee shops, and basements. Such actions re-imagine Iranian reality in ways that contest regime policies.

==== Saudi Arabia ====
Youth citizens of Saudi Arabia seek quiet forms of resistance because outright activism is prohibited. Students blog to share viewpoints and feelings despite potential personal risk.

=== Europe ===
==== Serbia ====
Throughout the 1990s, youth took to the streets to protest against Serbian leader Slobodan Milošević. Youth activists were credited with contributing to his resignation. During the years of protests youth faced unemployment, a failing education system, and economic instability. They created the Exit music festival, which lasted one hundred days and led up to the September 2000 elections. The first year this festival was called EXIT 00 and has been defined as "creative" and "politically savvy" activism. The festival contained a civic education component and continues today.

==== United Kingdom ====
Youth activism increased in the United Kingdom, especially England, in 2010 when David Cameron as leader of the Conservative Party became prime minister at the head of the Coalition government. Austerity measures affected young people in particular, in all aspects of their lives, including education, housing, employment, Youth Service, and leisure resulting in precarity. The governmental decision to cut higher education funding, triple university tuition fees to £9,000 a year and end of the Education Maintenance Allowance (EMA) in England and Wales sparked student activism, mostly demonstrations organized by the National Union of Students (NUS) in November and December 2010. See: 2010 United Kingdom student protests

Since then, the worsening situation for many young people and their despondency about politicians, in combination with the rise of social media and globalization have led to more youth activism.

This is particularly the case with environmentalism due to global warming and the climate crisis through the efforts of Greta Thunberg and the youth-led movements Fridays For Future, School Strike for Climate, and Extinction Rebellion Youth that started in the UK. Young environmental activists in the UK have been particularly active using a vast repertoire of contention as non-violent direct action and civil disobedience.

Young people are protesting in these movements around the world

=== North America ===
==== United States ====
Youth activism as a social phenomenon in the United States truly became defined in the mid- to late-nineteenth century when young people began forming labor strikes in response to their working conditions, wages, and hours. Mary Harris "Mother" Jones organized the first youth activism in the U.S. in 1908, marching 100,000 child miners from the coal mines of Pennsylvania to the U.S. Capitol in Washington, D.C. Youth newspaper carriers soon followed. These actions led the popular media of the times to separate youths' interests from their contemporary adult labor counterparts. This separation continued through the 1930s, when the American Youth Congress presented a "Bill of Youth Rights" to the US Congress. Their actions were indicative of a growing student movement present throughout the US from the 1920s through the early 1940s. The 1950s saw the Student Nonviolent Coordinating Committee bring young people into the larger civil rights movement; in 1959, Martin Luther King Jr. engaged youth activists in protesting against Bull Connor's racist law enforcement practices in Birmingham, Alabama. The spectrum of civil rights, youth rights and anti-war activism of Tom Hayden, Keith Hefner and other 1960s youth laid a powerful precedent for modern youth activism. John Holt, Myles Horton and Paulo Freire were important in this period. Youthful life and expression defined this era. In the 21st century, youth activism in the U.S. has shifted to social media platforms, through which youth have been able to rapidly disseminate information, resources, links, and petitions.

== Highlights of youth activism throughout the 21st century ==
Youth activism continues to take place in the 21st century at local, regional, national, and international levels. Youth activists today use technology and social media platforms such as Twitter, Instagram, Facebook, and TikTok to shed light on oppression and to highlight problems such as economic inequality, police misconduct, racial injustice, and much more through online platforms. Youth activism has transformed political participation through technology and created a form of engaged citizenship unique to today's young people . A significant shift in civic engagement has happened in the United States due to the rise and accessibility of political information online

=== 2010 ===
In 2010, the Student/Farmworker Alliance worked with Coalition of Immokalee Workers (CIW) to improve work standards for migrant workers in Florida.

Also, in 2010, the student activist group United Students Against Sweatshops successfully campaigned for Nike to improve standards for their workers in Honduras. Their slogan was an effective play on words of Nike's slogan: Just Pay it.

=== 2012 ===
While Malala Yousafzai has been an activist for female education, initially in Pakistan, since 2009, support for her cause reached international levels after she was shot by a Taliban gunman in 2012 because of her activism. Since then, Yousafzai has established a non-profit organization and received the Nobel Peace Prize. She also was the catalyst for a United Nations campaign for children's education worldwide.

=== 2013 ===
While the Black Lives Matter movement is not entirely a youth activist group, its founders were three young women who established it in response to the acquittal of the man who killed Trayvon Martin, an unarmed 17-year-old African American. Black Youth Project 100 (BYP100) was also established in response to that, but it limits participation to those aged 18 to 35. These two groups have worked together, and with others, to protest police killings of black people. Unlike BYP 100, Black Lives Matter has become an international movement with chapters outside of the United States

=== 2016 ===
While the causes of the Flint Water Crisis have been determined by independent investigators, the crisis is not yet resolved as work to replace the corroded water lines is slightly more than one third completed, with 7,750 of more than 22,000 lead-contaminated water services lines to replace. In 2016, Flint resident Amariyanna "Mari" Copeny, aged 8, wrote President Obama to bring to his attention the public health crisis caused the Flint Water crisis. President Obama accepted her invitation to come to Flint. In April 2018, Governor Rick Snyder announced that water quality is "within the standards" and the lead level doesn't exceed federal limits. This has resulted in the termination of a free bottled water program. Since then, Copeny, also known as Little Miss Flint, continues to work to improve the lives of youth in her community. Not only has she, in collaboration with Pack Your Back, raised more than $27,000 to provide thousands of bottled water since the government program was stopped, she has also raised money to provide 800 seats for under-served children to see Black Panther and crowdfunded to send Flint youth to see A Wrinkle in Time. Prior to these fundraising endeavors, she first worked with Pack Your Back to fill 1,000 backpacks for Flint students.

At age 7, Bana al-Abed started using Twitter with her mother's assistance to share her experiences living in Aleppo, Syria. Al-Abed has become a world-renowned youth activist, publishing a memoir in 2017 and receiving the Asian Awards' Rising Star of the Year award in 2018.

=== 2018 ===
The Stoneman Douglas High School shooting has resulted in not only some Stoneman Douglas students becoming youth activists for gun control legislation, but has also spurred a nationwide resurgence of youth activism, including school walkouts. A group of Stoneman Douglas students also founded the advocacy group Never Again MSD. Never Again MSD led March for Our Lives. "Never Again" is also one of the group's hashtags, with the slogan having its roots as a resistance rallying cry during the Holocaust and is used by the Jewish Defense League.

Swedish then-15-year-old student Greta Thunberg began an initially individual school strike, avoiding classes every Friday to protest in front of Riksdag against political inaction on global climate crisis. Through the following months, her activism sparked a worldwide youth movement, which intends to pressure governments and companies to adopt urgent policies on mitigating climate change. Thunberg herself engaged in delivering speeches at international events, such as 2018 United Nations Climate Change Conference. In the U.S., the climate crisis movement has grown through the efforts of youth-led organizations such as Zero Hour and the National Children's Campaign.

=== 2021 ===
Youth climate activists such as Sophia Kianni, Jamie Margolin, Vanessa Nakate, Isra Hirsi, Xiuhtezcatl Martinez, and Haven Coleman called for climate action to be taken at COP26. Youth activists were also included in global decision-making structures, such as Jerome Foster's participation in the White House Environmental Justice Advisory Council in the Biden administration, and H.D. Wright's election as Youth Representative at Education Cannot Wait, the United Nations fund for education in emergencies, chaired by Prime Minister Gordon Brown.

== See also ==
- Ageism
- Intergenerational equity
- Student activism
- Youth rights
- Youth suffrage
- Youth voice
