= Index of youth articles =

The following is a list of youth topics.

== A ==
Activism - Adolescent - Adultcentrism - Advertising to children - Africa - Age of candidacy - Age of consent - Age of majority - Alternative school - American Youth Congress - Antigua and Barbuda - Article 12 - Australian Clearinghouse for Youth Studies - Authoritarianism - Azerbaijan

== B ==
Banana youth - Bangladesh - Bar mitzvah - Bat mitzvah - Black-eyed children - Boston Youth Symphony Orchestras - Brazil

== C ==
Cambodia - Catholic youth work - Chest pain in children - Child abuse - Child labor (laws) - Child Labor Deterrence Act - Child Labour Programme of Action - Childhood in ancient Rome - Child - Children of clergy - Children of Heracles - Children of Llullaillaco - Children of the plantation - Children of presidents of the United States - Children's clothing - Children's Day - Children's films - Children's games - Children's hearing - Children's hospital - Children's literature - Children's magic - Children's museum - Children's ombudsman - Children's poetry - Children's radio (Radio networks) - Children's railway - Children's rights - Children's rights in Islam - Children's rights movement - Children's song - Child-selling - Child slavery - Civic engagement - Climate change and children - Clique - Closed adoption - Club - College - Coming of age - Commercial sexual exploitation of children - CommonAction - Community youth development - Company of Young Canadians - Concerned for Working Children - Confirmation - Conscientious objector - Contracts (right to sign) - Convention on the Rights of the Child - Corporal punishment - Cost of raising a child - COVID-19 pandemic impact on children - Councils - Crime - Culture - Curfews - Czech Republic

== D ==
Denmark - Development (in general) - Development (Community) - Development (Positive) - Declaration of the Rights of the Child - Disability - Disappearance of the Beaumont children - Driving age - Drinking age - Dedovshchina - Disciplinary institutions (Michael Foucault) - Dominican Republic - Drama (television)

== E ==
Ephebiphobia - Empowerment - Empowerment organizations - Evolving Capacities - Emancipation of minors - Education - Education reform - Empowerment - Engagement - Escape From Childhood - Eternal youth - European Free Alliance Youth - European Youth Forum - Evolving capacities - Exclusion

== F ==
Fagging - Fear of children - Fear of youth - Films - Finnish Youth Survey Series - Feral child - Fountain of Youth - Framing Youth - The Freechild Project - Free school (disambiguation)

== G ==
Gender dysphoria in children - Generations - Generation gap - Global/National Youth Service Day - Gulag schools - Graduation - Generation YES - Global Youth Action Network - Green children of Woolpit - Green Youth (disambiguation), youth divisions of Green political parties - Global/National Youth Service Day - Guatemala

== H ==
Hidden children during the Holocaust - History of Youth Rights in the United States - High school - Homeschooling - Hazing - Homelessness (among LGBTQ youth) - Higher education - Hakfar Hayarok - Youth in Hong Kong

== I ==
Idols - Impact of war on children - Impressment - In loco parentis - Indigo children - Incarceration (in Australia; Japan; the U.S.) - India - Intergenerational equity - International Programme on the Elimination of Child Labour - Islam and children

== J ==
Juvenile delinquency - Juvenile justice

== K ==
Kidnapping of children by Nazi Germany - Kidnapping of children in the Russian invasion of Ukraine

== L ==
Labour Youths - Leadership - Learn and Serve America - Leaving Certificate - Levée en masse - LGBTQ youth vulnerability (homelessness) - Liberal Religious Youth - Lie-to-children - List of books written by teenagers - List of people with the most children - Literacy (rate by country) - Literature - London matchgirls strike of 1888

== M ==
Media by youth - Medicine - Menarche - Medicine - Mentoring - Middle school - Military use of children - Ministry - Mobile phone - Mongolia - Movement - Movies - Music - Military conscription

== N ==
National Commission on Resources for Youth - National Youth Administration - National Youth Leadership Council - National Youth Rights Association - New Games Book - The Newsboys Strike - Nigeria - Not Back to School Camp

== O ==
Olympic Games - Optimism - Orchestra - Organizations

== P ==
Pakistan - Participation - Partnerships with adults - Participation - Pastors (youth) - Paternalism - Pedagogy of the Oppressed - Pedophobia - Pedophilia - Peacefire - Psychology - Peer pressure - Philanthropy - Philippine Senate Committee on Youth - Politics - Popular culture - Port Huron Statement - Positive youth development - Poster child - Pre-teen - Pregnancy - Pride - Programs - Prostitution of children - Protectionism - Publications about youth - Publications for youth - Puberty - Pubertal

== Q ==
Quinceañera

== R ==
Radical Youth - Ragging - Rebellion - Refugee children - Religion and children - Rights - Right-to-work laws - Rite of passage - Runaway youth - Rwanda

== S ==
Scouting - SDLP Youth - Secondary education - Seijin shiki - Sent-down youth - Service - Sex education - Sexuality in Britain - Sexuality in India - Sexuality in the United States - Shiloh Youth Revival Centers - Smoking, Smoking age - Sodder children disappearance - South Africa - Sports - Standardized test - Street children (culture) - Student activism - Student Nonviolent Coordinating Committee - Student rights - Students for a Democratic Society - Students for Sensible Drug Policy - Student voice - Studies - Socialist Youth - Subculture - Suffrage - Suicide - Sweet sixteen - Scouts Australia

== T ==
Taking Children Seriously - Teenage pregnancy - Teenage rebellion - Television - Technical school - The Teenage Liberation Handbook - Thailand women's national under-19 basketball team - Think of the children - Total institution - Transgender youth

== U ==
Youth in Uganda - Undernutrition in children - Unemployment - United Kingdom - United States - University - Unschooling - Upanayanam

== V ==
Video games - Vocational education - Voice (in general) - Voice (in schools) - Votes at 16 - Voting age - Voting rights

== W ==
Waithood - War children - Wild in the Streets (movie) - Witchcraft accusations against children - Women and children first - Work - World Scout Committee - World Youth Day - Worst Forms of Child Labour Convention, 1999 - Worst Forms of Child Labour Recommendation

== Y ==
Yemenite Children Affair - YMCA Youth and Government - Yoga for children - Young adult fiction - Youth - Youth Activism Project - Youth Assisting Youth - Youth: The 26% Solution - Youth crew - Template:Youth Empowerment - Youth For Equality - Youth Health - Youth Liberation of Ann Arbor - Youth On Board - Parliaments - Youth Radio - Youth Service America - Youth wing - Youth/adult partnerships - Youth-led media - Youthfulness

== Z ==
Zero tolerance (schools) - Zionist youth movement

== See also ==
- Index of children's rights articles
- Index of youth rights–related articles
- List of articles related to youth rights
- List of youth organizations
