= Index of youth rights–related articles =

This is an incomplete list of articles that are relevant to youth rights, which can or may never satisfy any objective standard for completeness. Revisions and additions are welcome.

== A ==
- Adultcentrism
- Adultism
- Age of candidacy
- Age of consent
- Age of majority
- Ageism
- Alcohol consumption by youth in the United States
- Alternative school
- Americans for a Society Free from Age Restrictions
- Article 12

== B ==
- Bailey v. Drexel Furniture Co. - on regulating child labour through the tax code
- "Barting Over"
- Behavior modification facility

== C ==
- Camel racing - use of child jockeys
- Capacity (law)
- Child advocacy
- Child Labor Deterrence Act
- Child labor laws in the United States
- Child labour
- Children's Online Privacy Protection Act
- Closed adoption
- Commission des droits de la personne et des droits de la jeunesse (English: "Human Rights and Youth Rights Commission")
- Compulsory education
- Conscription
- Convention on the Rights of the Child
- Corporal punishment
- Criminalization
- Curfew
- Child abuse

== D ==
- David Joseph Henry
- Declaration of the Rights of the Child
- Democratic education

== E ==
- Emancipation of minors
- Ephebiphobia - the fear of youth
- Escape from Childhood
- Ever Reviled Records
- Evolving capacities

== F ==
- Fair Labor Standards Act of 1938
- Fear of children
- Freechild Institute for Youth Engagement
- Adam Fletcher

== G ==
- Gambling age

== H ==
- Hammer v. Dagenhart
- David J. Hanson
- History of youth rights in the United States
- John Holt
- Homeschooling
- Human rights and youth sport

== I ==
- In loco parentis
- Intergenerational equity
- Inter-Agency Guiding Principles on Unaccompanied and Separated Children

== J ==
- Juvenile delinquency
- Category:Juvenile law
- Juvenile court
- Juvenile Liaison

== K ==
- Alex Koroknay-Palicz

== L ==
- Legal drinking age
- Legal working age
- Lyn Duff

== M ==
- "Marge vs. Singles, Seniors, Childless Couples and Teens, and Gays"
- Mike A. Males
- Minimum driving age
- Minor (law)
- Minors and abortion
- Morse v. Frederick

== N ==
- National Youth Rights Association

== O ==
- One World Youth Project
- Odisha State Child Protection Society

== P ==
- Paternalism
- Peacefire
- Port Huron Statement
- Neil Postman

== Q ==
- Quebec Charter of Human Rights and Freedoms
- Queer Youth Network

== R ==
- Right-to-work law
- Residential treatment center

== S ==
- Smoking age
- Social class
- Sonia Yaco
- Status offense
- Student activism
- Student rights
- Students for a Democratic Society
- Suffrage

== T ==
- Taking Children Seriously
- "The President Wore Pearls"
- This Is Paris
- Three O'Clock Lobby

== U ==
- Unschooling

== V ==
- Voting age
- Votes at 16

== W ==
- "Wild Barts Can't Be Broken"
- Wild in the Streets
- World Youth Congress Movement

== Y ==
- Youth activism
- Youth-adult partnership
- Young Communist League of Canada
- Youth empowerment
- Youth Liberation of Ann Arbor
- Youth participation
- Youth politics
- Youth rights
- Youth suffrage
- Youth voice

== Z ==
- Zero tolerance policies in schools
