= National Youth Summit =

Youth summit

The National Youth Summit, subtitled "Young People: Partners in Fulfilling the Promise," occurred June 22 through June 25, 2000 in Orlando, Florida. Coordinated by the Corporation for National Service, America's Promise and the Points of Light Foundation, the event drew approximately 1,200 youth and adults. The Summit was a follow-up to the "White House Conference on Teenagers: Raising Responsible and Resourceful Youth" held May 2, 2000. The Summit was attributed with increasing attendance at the simultaneous National Community Service Conference, and with raising national awareness about youth service and service learning.

== About ==
The National Youth Summit was a youth-led effort to "highlight and foster community service through youth-adult partnerships". It was held in conjunction with the annual National Community Service Conference, an annual meeting of organizations that promote volunteerism. The Summit was attended by approximately 1,200 people from 27 organizations in over 40 states, Guam, and Puerto Rico.

== Activities ==
The program included interactive activities designed to "develop the knowledge and service skills of young people; highlight community service provided by youth-adult partnerships; motivate youth and adults to give back through service; and foster youth-adult partnerships." The conference featured approximately 80 workshops, with seventy-five percent of them being led by youth, including youth from across the nation.

== Financial support ==
In addition to in-kind contributions from the Corporation for National Service, America's Promise and the Points of Light Foundation, the Summit received support from a variety of foundations. They included the Ewing Marion Kauffman Foundation, the Bill and Melinda Gates Foundation, the Fannie Mae Foundation, the Robert Wood Johnson Foundation and Eckerd Youth Alternatives. Eleven corporations provided in-kind support, including General Mills, Levi Strauss, and Tupperware.

== Legacy ==
Many communities, including Waco, Texas, began holding annual Youth Summits that were directly inspired by the National Youth Summit of 2000. After the conference, many boards found new roles for youth members possible, and many youth led campaigns to engage youth in organizational decision-making.

== See also ==
- Youth activism
- Youth voice
- Youth engagement
- Youth empowerment
- Youth participation
- Youth rights
- Youth service
- List of youth topics
