= Youth engagement =

Youth engagement is the sentiment young people feel towards a particular person, activity, place or outcome. It has been a focus of youth development, public policy and social change movements for at least forty years. According to a Cornell University program, "Youth engagement is one of the buzzwords in the youth development field. Similar terms are youth voice, youth involvement, youth participation, and youth in governance."

== About ==
A study exploring foster youth and aging out defines youth engagement as, "involving young people in the creation of their own destinies", and suggests that in social work that means "genuinely involving them in case planning and encouraging them to advocate for themselves." This sentiment was best summarized by youth who said, "Nothing about us without us." The concept of youth engagement has emerged in recent years as a leading-edge, broad-based approach and best practice to meet the needs of youth, including youth at risk. It is a process that offers meaningful participation for youth—that is, participation with passion—and opportunities for youth to take responsibility and leadership while working in partnership with caring adults who value, respect and share power with them.

=== Activities ===
According to a variety of research, there are numerous personal, interpersonal, social, cultural and organizational avenues for youth engagement. These can include:

- Supportive family background
- Mentors or role models
- Involvement in cooperative activities
- Cultivation of intrinsic interest
- Awareness of moral and political issues
- Traits such as moral sensitivity and optimism
- Adult support
- Youth-friendly environment
- Completion of meaningful tasks
- Learning and utilization of new skills

Specific activities have been cited as fostering youth engagement as well. They include:

- Youth councils
- Youth-led media
- Youth advisory boards
- Youth organizing
- Self-advocacy
- Community youth development
- Consulting on public policy
- Community coalitions
- Organizational decision-making
- School-based service learning, and
- Youth conferences

Both the philosophy and activities within a program or activity need to be a "good fit" for the young people participating in them. In the United States, activities and campaigns including those by the National Commission on Resources for Youth, the Freechild Institute and Youth Communications have been cited for their effectiveness in engaging young people.

== Spectra of activities ==
Research has identified a spectrum of approaches to youth engagement, beginning with training for adults that work with youth. These range from traditional programs that treat youth as clients to organizations that are led by youth and for youth. There are also groups who foster engagement among traditionally non-involved youth by working to foster more significant youth participation outside of the program or organization itself. Other points in this spectrum can include:

- Youth-serving: The program targets youth as consumers of service
- Youth input: Youth evaluate or provide feedback on the program
- Youth-engaged: Youth are involved in program development and/or delivery and
- Youth-led: The program concept and/or organization came from youth
- Youth-connecting: The activity facilitates youth interaction and builds connections through social mediums

Each has value, and where a program or groups sits depends on the degree to which youth are engaged in the program with meaningful participation, and the degree to which the organization offering the program has policies and infrastructures to support youth involvement in a meaningful way.

== Outcomes ==
A number of foundations recognize youth engagement as a best practice in programs for young people. For example, the Paul Allen Foundation promotes youth engagement as an avenue to achieving early reading proficiency, expand opportunities for experiential learning, and involve young people in addressing community needs. The Walter and Duncan Gordon Foundation in Canada supports youth engagement because it believes young Canadians, "already tend to think globally; take advantage of opportunities to expand their understanding of global challenges; want to contribute new ideas and perspectives to the discussion about Canadian international policy and; are creative in their use of new technologies to further their engagement in the world." The Ontario Trillium Foundation recognizes youth engagement as a best practice and has been developing a framework to support youth engagement in its grantmaking and encourage applications that include a youth engagement approach. Hands On Learning Australia implement youth engagement programs as an integral part of secondary education in Australian schools. These programs attempt to reengage school age youth through building strong relationships within the context of practical activities, and also address literacy and numeracy issues.

Youth engagement has been identified as a key measure in promoting adolescent health programs. Increasing the likelihood of young people voting has also been an outcome of said programs. Engaging youth in pro-social opportunities is also a goal in the field of Positive Youth Development.

It is also seen as central to developing "inclusive participation" in civil society. Numerous national initiatives have utilized that belief to rationalize a variety of programs, including efforts focused on civic engagement, social justice and education reform. In the latter field, student engagement is used to specifically address this issues within school environments. Several researchers, such as Barry Checkoway, Peter Levine and Shawn Ginwright, as well as advocates including Karen Pittman and Adam Fletcher have been acknowledged for their efforts to promote youth engagement.

== Challenges ==
Youth engagement faces a variety of obstacles. They include a "disjunction in what adults believe is important to do with young people, and what they actually do," as well as social norms that encourage youth engagement, and the presence of strong norms that discourage youth-adult partnerships. A historical disconnect between positive youth development and civic engagement has also been cited as a leading barrier.

== Innovations ==
Youth engagement has taken a huge growth over the past six years with the advent of social networks. The activities that promote youth development and social change movements are now shifting to the World Wide Web, fostering online communities based on interests, causes, and purpose. Young people are promoting ideas, vocalizing their goals, organizing community groups, engaging in political discussions, reclaiming identities, creating identities, connecting with others, and taking over these networks full force as their own personal environments. The engagement over social networks "forms and maintains social capital, a dimension that assesses one’s ability to stay connected with members of a community." This connection is stimulated by the activity characteristic of the particular virtual community. Social network sites engage activity such as individual presentation of oneself, articulating and building outside networks, creating work-related collaboration, building romantic relationships, provoking political debates, connecting college student populations and opportunities, sharing hobbies and interests, and essentially forming anything that meets the imagination, made possible through the innovative capacities of current technology. Today’s youth are able to "tie offline networks to online memberships" through current social network sites like Facebook, Twitter, LinkedIn, MySpace, Friendster, and Blogger. They support the "maintenance of existing social ties and the formation of new connections, connecting with others outside their pre-existing social group or location, liberating them to form communities around shared interests." This increased social capital enhances youth engagement and manages interactions regarding current events around the world, major life changes, and relations as they move from one offline community to another such as changing schools or joining different civic and community groups. The intensity and usage over online communities are reliable indicators of current trends among youth and psychological well-being. The robust growth of this current technology is steadily growing and becoming a greater percentage of daily youth interactions.

== See also ==
- Student engagement
- Youth rights
- Youth participation
- Anti-oppressive practice
- Positive youth development
