= Article 12 =

Article 12 may refer to:

- Article 12 (organisation), British children's rights organisation
- Article 12 of the Constitution of Costa Rica
- Article 12 of the Constitution of Singapore
- Article 12 of the European Convention on Human Rights
