= Mariska Faylné Hentaller =

Hungarian writer (1850-1927)

- Born: 7 July 1850; Jászberény
- Died: 20 October 1927 (aged 77); Budapest
- Citizenship: Hungarian
- Occupation: writer

Mariska Faylin Hunthaller (7 July 1850 in Jászberény – 20 October 1927 in Budapest) was a Hungarian writer.

== Life ==
She was the daughter of Ede Hunthaller and Constanta Bata. She was widowed in 1879 at the age of 19 and then began to work in youth literature to fill Her time. her short stories and novels are mainly based on Hungarian and foreign folk tales.

== Works ==
- Mesék és regék tíz képpel (1883)
- Kedvenc könyvem (1884)
- Kis mesék. Népmesék, regék és elbeszélések (1884)
- Mesék a fonóból (1886)
- Hol volt, hol nem volt (1886)
- Hetedhét országon túl (1886)
- Mesék és regék gyermekek számára (1888)
- A magyar írónőkről (1889)
- Leányévek (elbeszélés, 1894)
- Fekete Kató és más elbeszélések (1899)
- A Sződy lányok (1904)
- Mesekincstár (1905)
- Árva Margit (1905)
- Otthon nélkül … haza nélkül (regény, 1918)
- Legszebb meséi (1919)
- Sok-sok csecse tarka mese (1920)
