= Three O'Clock Lobby =

The Three O'Clock Lobby Logo and Address

The Three O'Clock Lobby was a statewide, youth-run youth advocacy organization in Michigan in the late 1970s. It was one of the forerunners of the American youth rights movement.

== Formation ==
In 1976, Michigan's Office of Juvenile Justice Services (OJJS) experimented with youth representation and asked 16-year-old Linda Feldt of Ann Arbor to serve on a commission formed to evaluate juvenile justice in the State and make recommendations for change. The commission formed about seven task forces to focus on specific aspects of juvenile justice, and, at the urging of Ms. Feldt, one or two young people were recruited to serve on each of those task forces as well. After several months, Ms. Feldt arranged for all of the youth commissioners to meet and share their experiences. The ten or twelve young people at that meeting decided to form an organization, naming it The Three O'Clock Lobby, since it would operate after school hours. Among the individuals at that meeting was 16-year-old Christopher Jens Magnus, the future director of the organization.

With the help of supportive individuals in the OJJS, the new group incorporated in January 1977 and held a conference for young people in March, with workshops on the rights of young people and working with legislators. Adults were permitted to attend only if they were accompanied by a youth. About 250 young people from around the state attended the conference.

Linda Feldt wrote a proposal for a state grant to hire young people to staff a toll-free telephone number to assist youth in the state with questions about their rights, and make referrals. The state awarded the group $10,000. Since free space was available to the group in the OJJS offices in Lansing, the amount proved to be excessive, even though staff were always paid ten cents an hour over the minimum wage. Near the end of the year, the OJJS completed its work and closed down its offices, but free office space (a small back room) was promptly offered by the Michigan Council on Crime and Delinquency in Lansing. The toll-free line was operated by Chris Magnus, Peggy Hicks, Julie Powell, and several other volunteers from the Lansing area. As the group tried to spend the remainder of its money, it focused on promotion, and placed advertising in city buses. One of those bus signs was seen by Susan Wishnetsky, a student at Michigan State University, who promptly joined the group and helped in the creation of its newsletter.

== Drinking age controversy ==
The state grant was renewed for 1978. The group continued to produce its newsletter, created buttons and bumper stickers, and held a second conference in June 1978, but the limitations of state money began to frustrate the group. The Three O'Clock Lobby's initial focus was on decriminalization of status offenses, acts that were illegal for young people only because of their age, such as running away, truancy, disobeying parents, or using alcohol. A bill that would have moved the state in this direction now seemed to be getting compromised away, and the group's public appearances and testimony on the issue (and some controversial newsletter articles) seemed to be insufficient.

Further, a proposal to raise the state's drinking age from 18 to 21 had succeeded in getting onto state ballots, and the group, which had decided to work on the issue, had to be careful not to use state funds to do so. Members leafleted on college campuses, appeared on TV and radio shows, and spoke at churches and community centers, explaining how statistics on the issue had been distorted by the other side. But leaflets, travel, and other expenses had to be paid for with private donations. As the election neared, the Michigan Council on Alcohol Problems, the primary group promoting the raising of the drinking age, asked the state's attorney general to investigate the Three O'Clock Lobby for using state funds to oppose their ballot proposal. The investigation was quickly called off, but the group decided to pursue a private grant for the coming year. The vote on the drinking age on November 7, 1978 was a painfully close one for the group -- the ballot proposal passed with only 54%.

Although the group had been sending out introductory letters to private foundations since June, in November it faced the prospect of no funds and no strong issue to mobilize supporters. Chris Magnus and Susan Wishnetsky spent many evenings in a local Mexican restaurant writing a grant proposal to the Playboy Foundation, which seemed to be the group's best hope for funding. A response and an invitation to visit the foundation came quickly, and before the end of the November, about six members of the Three O'Clock Lobby traveled to Chicago to answer questions about their proposal. The Playboy Foundation granted the Three O'Clock Lobby a one-time amount of $5,000.

== Year of the Child and eventual dissolution ==
The year 1979 was named the International Year of the Child, and a state-sponsored conference was held to bring youth workers together to kick off the year and discuss youth issues. The conference was held on a school day. The planners were all adults, and only adults were being invited. Chris Magnus proposed that the Three O'Clock Lobby hold a protest outside the conference, so the group prepared leaflets entitled "What If the Year of the Woman Had Been Run By Men?" About six young people distributed the leaflets, which criticized the conference for discouraging youth participation, but also offered to work with youth agencies to promote positive change. The group also handed out badges reading "I Support Youth Participation," one of which was worn by Governor Milliken as he made his opening address. The Three O'Clock Lobby received some favorable press coverage about the protest, but this did not seem to invigorate the organization.

The group cancelled its toll-free telephone line and began a recruitment drive, but as members left for college or employment, membership dwindled. The private grant money was stretched to its limit, but at the end of 1981, the group allowed its incorporation to lapse, and the Three O'Clock Lobby was no more.

== See also ==
- Youth voice
- Youth participation
