= Alex Koroknay-Palicz =

American activist

- Born: July 2, 1981 (age 45); Kalamazoo, Michigan, U.S.
- Occupations: Executive Director, NYRA
- Website: www.oneandfour.org

Alex Koroknay-Palicz (born July 2, 1981) is an American activist in Washington, D.C. He is the former executive director of the National Youth Rights Association serving in that post from 2000 till 2012.

== Biography ==
Koroknay-Palicz was born in Kalamazoo, Michigan, and grew up in Holland, Michigan. By high school, he began to articulate that inequality in terms of ageism and wrote articles for his school newspaper on the subject. Senior year at Holland High School, Koroknay-Palicz discovered several local businesses with policies limiting the number of students allowed inside at any one time. Recognizing these policies as ageism, he decided to do something about it. After much research he learned these policies were illegal under Michigan's Elliot-Larsen Civil Rights Act. Koroknay-Palicz demanded the city enforce this law at a speech before a Holland city council meeting. The matter was referred to Al Serrano in the city's Human Rights Department, who succeeded in overturning the policies at all the stores in question.

In 1999 Koroknay-Palicz began attending American University in Washington, D.C. He quickly became involved in the youth rights movement, chiefly as the executive director of the National Youth Rights Association from 2000 to 2012. Koroknay-Palicz became a major figure in all aspects of the youth rights movement and made fighting ageism his chief purpose. Koroknay-Palicz serves on the board of advisors for the Freechild Project. His writing appears in several publications and websites. In 2006 Koroknay-Palicz joined the Board of Directors of CAFETY.

Koroknay-Palicz and Robert Epstein co-founded the First Annual National Youth Rights Day which occurred on April 14, 2010 Epstein wrote The Young Person's Bill of Rights for this event.

Koroknay-Palicz currently lives in Takoma Park, Maryland and served on the city's voting rights taskforce after Takoma Park became the first city in the United States to lower its voting age to 16. Testified in support of successful 16-year-old voting age bills in Takoma Park and Hyattsville, Maryland. He currently works for the National Association of Counties and in October 2014 married Tricia Gonwa. In 2015 he resumed his involvement in the National Youth Rights Association after a three-year absence. He currently serves on NYRA's board of directors and is organizing the #16tovote Coalition in support of the 16-year-old voting age bill in Washington, D.C.

== Publicity ==
As spokesman for the National Youth Rights Association, Koroknay-Palicz's first major media citation dates to 2000 when Slate.com interviewed him. Since then he has appeared on several television and radio networks, including two appearances on CNN and Fox News

Koroknay-Palicz has been quoted by several nationally recognized publications on a variety of topics related to youth rights. They include the subject of student rights in The Christian Science Monitor; youth suffrage in The Boston Globe and the Los Angeles Times; the legal drinking age in The New York Times; internet censorship in the Chicago Tribune; curfews in the Jackson Free Press, and; the minimum driving age in USA Today and the Associated Press. He has also been cited in international publications such as The Guardian.

He has also been cited on the topics of ageism in the Olympics, graduated driver licensing, civics education public schools, the Bong Hits 4 Jesus trial, youth criminalization, and several other issues.

He has also been noted for his opposition to the drinking age limit policies of Mothers Against Drunk Driving who want to keep it at age 21.

== Bibliography ==
- Koroknay-Palicz, A. (2003) "Youth Demand a Voice and a Vote", Wiretap Magazine.
- Koroknay-Palicz, A. "Youth Rights," in Beale, S. and Abdalla, A. (2003) Millennial Manifesto. InstantPublisher.

== See also ==
- National Youth Rights Association
- Youth rights
