= Common preference =

Common preference is an everyone wins situation in a number of places:

- Zero-sum game#Non-zero-sum
- Taking Children Seriously
- Win-win situation
