= List of youth publications =

The following is a list of youth publications, including magazines, journals and books created about youth.

== A ==
- Australian Clearinghouse for Youth Studies

== B ==
- Bomb The Suburbs

== E ==
- Escape From Childhood

== F ==
- Framing Youth

== J ==
- Juvenile Justice Information Exchange

== N ==
- New Games Book

== O ==
- One80

== T ==
- The Teenage Liberation Handbook

== V ==
- Vertigo (UTS)

== Y ==
- Youth: The 26% Solution
- Youth Today

== See also ==
- List of youth-led media - Includes publications created by youth.
- Category:Young adult literature - Includes publications created for youth.
