= Youth and disability =

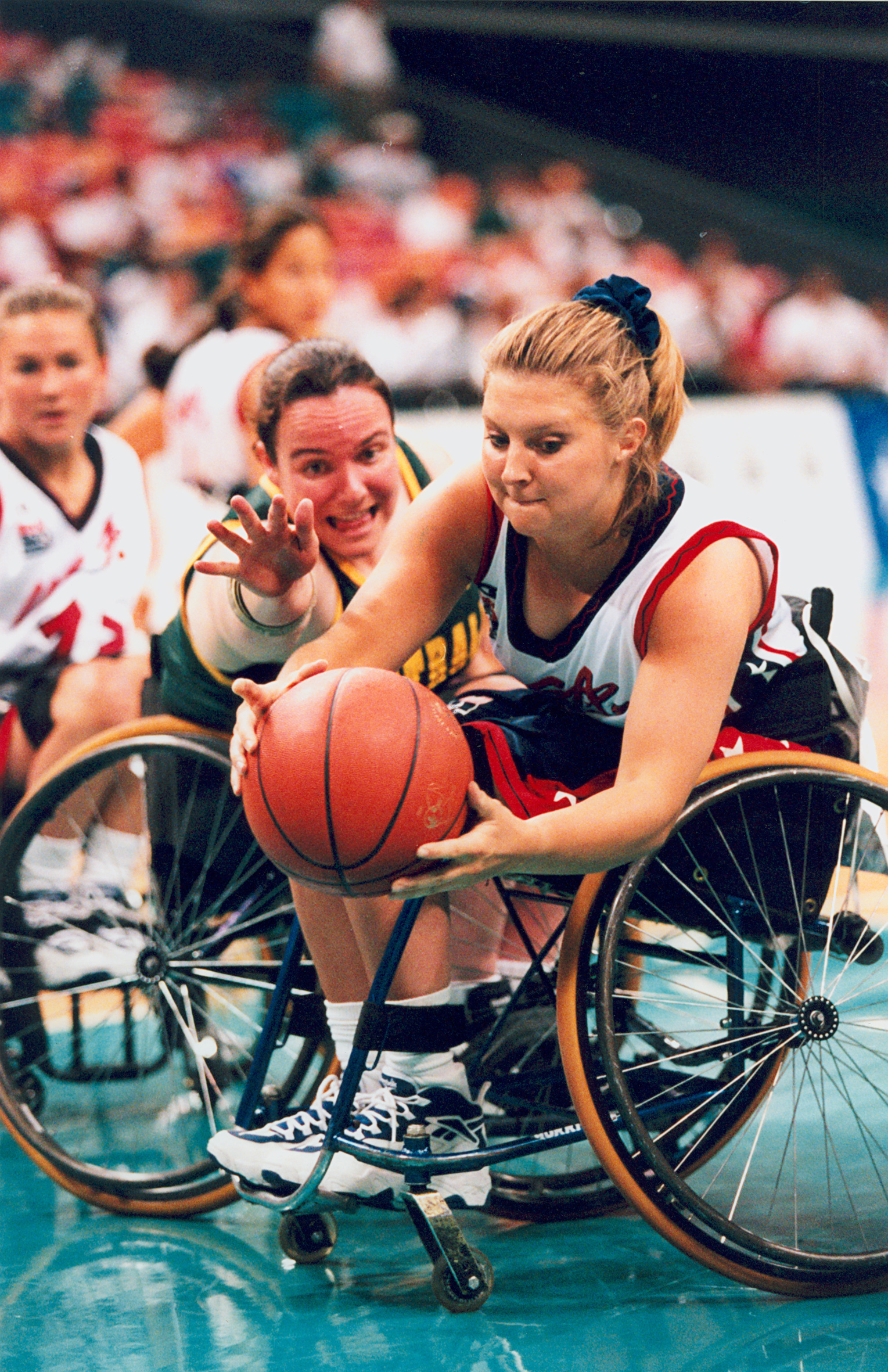
ACPS Atlanta 1996

Approximately 180-220 million young people live with disabilities globally, with 80% living in the developing world, therefore lacking access to education, healthcare and employment. Disability includes physical, mental or mental illness. Many young people live a healthy and stable life, although people with disabilities may have more obstacles than those without because of their possible limitations, created by physical weakness and social incapacity.

== Disability and education ==
=== Legal regulations in the United States ===
Before the 1970s, there were no major federal laws that protected the civil or constitutional rights of Americans with disabilities. The civil rights movement started off the "disability rights movement", which focused on social and therapeutic services for those with disabilities, and in 1975 the Individuals with Disabilities Education Act (IDEA) was created. This law establishes the rights of children with disabilities to attend public schools, to receive services designed to meet their needs free of charge, and to receive instruction in regular education classrooms alongside non-disabled children.

The IDEA also authorized federal grants to states to cover some of the costs of special education services for youth aged three to twenty-one. Additions to the law focused on improving access to general education and curriculum (inclusion programs), developing appropriate assessments, implementing appropriate disciplinary procedures and alternative placements, and creating transition services for youth leaving the education system. This transition can be difficult for youth with a disability if it is too sudden- many of these youth struggle with the independence that graduation allows. In 2004, additions were made to promote better accountability for results, enhance parent involvement, encourage the use of proven practices and materials (increase research on current practices), and reduce administrative burdens for teachers, states and local school districts. Before 1975, only one in five children with identified disabilities attended public school, and many states explicitly excluded children with certain types of disabilities from school; these included children who were blind or deaf, and children labeled "emotionally disturbed" or "mentally retarded".

=== Current special education system ===
The current special education system can offer many different supports and services including transportation, speech-language pathology and audiology services, psychological services, physical and occupational therapy, therapeutic recreation, counseling services including rehabilitation counseling, orientation, and mobility services, medical services for diagnostic or evaluation purposes, school health services, social work services in school, and parent counseling and training children. Each unique student and their unique symptoms of their disability is going to require different supports from another youth with a disability (even if it is the same disability). Within the classroom, there are many different ways that teachers and administration can adjust their work to meet the needs of the youth in their classroom with disabilities. Just a few of these adaptations are curriculum modification, small-group or individual instruction, and teachers who are especially skilled in motivating students, adapting instructional materials, teaching reading skills and language arts, and managing student behaviors. Specific accommodations might include tutors or aides, more time for students to take tests, alternative tests or assessments, modified grading standards, slower-paced instruction, shorter or different assignments, more frequent feedback, a reader or interpreter, a peer tutor, or special behavior management approaches and programs. Many students with mental or physical disabilities are excluded from their peers, being segregated in school. This leads to students with disabilities not getting the educational skills and social skills that students with and without disabilities would get when doing included.

== Challenges and hardships ==
=== Family effects ===
Being a youth with a disability can create a financial burden on the individual, as well as to those who provide care and support. Their families also incur extra direct and indirect costs. Families with disabled youth spend money on health care, therapeutic, behavioral, or educational services; transportation; caregivers; and other special needs services. Indirect costs include reductions in parents' ability to work because of additional time that is required to care for a child with a disability combined with high costs or unavailability of adequate child care. This is a similar problem to one that many families face, but disabled youth may live at home longer or require more attention. These costs alone can decrease the financial stability of a family. Having a child with disabilities increases the likelihood that the mother (or less often the father) will either curtail hours of work or stop working altogether. One study showed that a decline in employment of 9% for mothers with a disabled child relative to all mothers, with a resultant estimate of approximately $3,150 in lost pay. In addition, mothers who continue to work are estimated to reduce time worked by around two hours a week, with a range of between half an hour and five hours a week.

Families with more resources may be able to maintain financial stability, even with the financial strain of having a youth with a disability. These resources may provide treatment, affordable housing, therapy, etc. for a youth with special needs. As a conclusion from the research listed above, these children are more likely to be able to function independently from their family, and live on their own at an earlier age, than those from families that may not be able to afford these extra resources.

=== Poverty ===
Eighty percent of people with disabilities live in resource-poor societies. They are often considered to be a burden, and carry a very negative social stigma. Many are unable to contribute to society, attend school, or find work.

=== Disabled youth in the justice system ===
In the justice system, youth are disproportionately male, poor and have significant learning or behavioral disabilities to the extent that they require services listed under the IDEA. There are 1345,000 youth incarcerated in the U.S. system, and 30%-70% of these individuals are youth with disabilities. Psychiatric disorders occur more often among prisoners than among those outside of prison. Such illnesses relate to at least some of the difficulties former inmates experience after they are released. Those who were diagnosed with a mental disability may have a harder time readjusting to life outside of prison after being released; this often consists of repetition of crime, or difficulty maintaining independent stability financially or emotionally.

== See also ==
- Accessibility
- Disability
- Index of youth articles
- List of disability rights organizations
- Special Olympics
