= History of youth work =

The history of youth work in the United Kingdom goes back to the birth of the Industrial Revolution in the 18th century, which was the first time that young men left their own homes and cottage industries to migrate to the big towns. The result of this migration was an emergent youth culture in urban areas, which was responded to by the efforts of local people.

== 1844–1900 ==
In 1844 the first organisation whose sole aim was to address the needs of young men was founded. The YMCA was set up by George Williams. Williams was from London and his goal was to create an organisation that catered for the spiritual and emotional needs as well as the physical needs of the young men that he saw around him. The delivery of Williams' work was mainly through missionaries working on the streets of London though it wasn't long before the first hostel was founded.

Work with young women however was seen as less important because young women's needs at this time were seen as being centred on homemaking, which were already (supposedly) provided for in the home. This changed in 1878 when youth work pioneer Maude Stanley developed work with young women around the Five Dials area of London. She went on to establish the Girls Club Union.

Later that century in 1883 the Boys' Brigade was founded by William Alexander Smith. He was a teacher and like Williams in 1844 his aim was to provide for the needs of young men that he worked with. His organisation was based more around the military than the YMCA was, though it was still mainly a Christian organisation.

In London in 1896 Lily Montagu contacted young Jewish people from Eastern European families in the east end and set up an organisation called Children's Synagogue Services. Montagu went on to become a founder member of the National Organisation of Girls' Clubs (now called UK Youth) and was a key figure in the development of Jewish youth work.

== 1900–1950 ==
In 1902, in the US, the Woodcraft Indians was set up by Ernest Thompson Seton. Despite the name, this was created for non-Indian children. At first the group was for boys only, but later it would also include girls. Seton instructed the children in his town in Connecticut in outdoor "Woodcraft" – knowledge and skills of life in the woods – and based much of the group's terminology and structure on the misconceptions about Native Americans that were common in that era. The concept spread internationally to become the Woodcraft Movement and many of these branches still exist. Seton's Woodcraft scheme also had a strong influence on later youth services and organizations, particularly, the Scout Movement.

In 1907 Scouting was founded by Robert Baden-Powell following the success of his book Aids to Scouting. His inspiration for this organisation was his experience during the Siege of Mafeking in the Second Boer War (1899–1902). Like Smith's Boys' Brigade, the organisation was uniformed, being heavily influenced by the military, though it has changed tremendously as a movement since that time. For the first time youth work in the UK was taken out of the streets of London as Scouting was made into a national (and before long international) organisation.

A year later in 1908, Charles Russell began his work with young men on the streets in deprived areas of Manchester, leading to the foundation of the National association of boys' clubs movement.

In 1910 the Girl Guides (and later Girl Scouts in the United States) were founded by Baden-Powell with the aid of his sister Agnes. This was because young women were approaching Scout leaders asking if they would be able to join the organisation, and Baden-Powell responded to this but he felt having girls and boys in the same scout troops would be an unnecessary distraction for both groups.

Contemporaneous with the development of Scouting was the creation of the TUXIS movement in Canada. Originally developed through the YMCA and later governed by the Boys' Work Board, TUXIS activities for boys aged 15 to 17 focused on Christian values, leadership, the outdoors, and camping. The Boys' Work Board also created the Trail Rangers program for boys aged 12 – 14. A parallel group was established for girls, called the Canadian Girls in Training (CGIT).

Later in the 20th century concerns were raised about the number of young people not in membership of youth organisations. This led to the first (unsuccessful) attempt to register all young people in Britain in 1941.

The next approach to develop was that by arts worker Marie Paneth in 1944. She went out onto the streets of London to address issues such as health, family breakdown and poverty in war-torn parts of the city, using a disused air raid shelter as her base. Her aim was to make good, independent citizens for a good community.

During the second world war, leaders were looking for strategies to prevent a World War III – which would probably be fought with nuclear bombs and annihilate humanity. One of the strategies put in place was to set-up youth organisations worldwide and have youth with similar fields of interest organize and participate in youth exchanges. At these events, youth from different countries and cultures would get to know each other, come together around constructive activities and bring back positive experiences to their societies. These youngsters and young adults would eventually become adults in places of responsibilities and in case of a crisis, it was hoped that this civil network would resist war mongering rhetorics, lies and disinformation. Thus, e.g. in 1956, UNESCO's International Union for Conservation of Nature and Natural Resources (IUCN) since called the World Conservation Union, created a youth section, the International Youth Federation for the Study and Conservation of Nature (IYF), renamed to International Youth Federation for Environmental Studies and Conservation. In 1983, because of growing success, regional branches were created s.a. the European branch Youth Environment Europe (YEE).

== 1950–2000 ==
By 1959 widespread moral panic in the press about teenage delinquency led the British government to look into a national response to catering for the needs of young people. In 1960 a government report known as The Albemarle Report was released, which outlined the need for local government agencies to take on responsibility for providing extracurricular activities for young people. Out of this the statutory sector of the youth service was born. For the first time youth centres and fully paid full-time youth workers made an appearance across the whole of Britain.

Five years later the National Association of Youth Clubs (now UK Youth) published a report called The Unattached about experimental street projects that were taking place up and down the country. It outlined the need for something more than youth centres in certain parts of the country because young people were still being excluded, and it sold tens of thousands of copies.

== 2000–present ==
A further government report in 2001 entitled Transforming Youth Work for the first time outlined the statutory responsibility for all local government organisations to provide targeted youth work activities within their region. With targets published in 2003 set on 2001 census information many local authorities were given the push they needed to establish quality services.

== See also ==
- Youth-led media
- Youth activism
- Youth voice
- Youth rights
- Youth participation
- List of youth organizations
- The European Youth Portal is the starting place for the European Union's youth policy, with Erasmus+ as one of its key initiatives.
