= David Henry (activist) =

English writer and human rights activist

David Joseph Henry is a writer, human rights activist and former parliamentary candidate from Manchester, England. He is a former pupil of Oakwood High School in Chorlton.

In 1999 he co-founded the Queer Youth Network. In the same year, he represented the United Kingdom at the 10th commemorative meeting of the UNCRC in Geneva, as a member of the youth-led children's rights organisation Article 12.

He writes a regular column in London's QX magazine, and has been a contributor to the Pink Paper and OutNorthWest. David has been outspoken in the media and petitioned the government on the issue of civil partnerships and has argued that they "create a two-tier system of inequality".

In June 2009 he attempted to perform a citizen's arrest on Salford MP Hazel Blears at a constituency party meeting in Swinton.

He was selected to contest the Salford and Eccles seat at the 2010 general election, beating presumptive nominee Merseyside TUC leader Alec McFadden by a majority vote after responding to Martin Bell's call for a "community champion" during a public meeting in Eccles. He stood for the Trade Unionist and Socialist Coalition (TUSC) and received 730 votes (1.8% share of the total votes) and Hazel Blears received 16,655 (40.1% of the overall share of the vote). Despite the distribution of votes, David's campaign generated notable media interest.

Comedian Mark Steel co-hosted a fundraising gig at the Dancehouse Theatre in support of Henry's election campaign. He was shadowed by a film crew and was the focus of the 30-minute documentary film The Candidate which premièred on Channel M. Described as an "intimate and amusing portrait". It has since been shown at a number of film festivals and has received acclaim after being nominated for the Royal Television Society Awards, Exposures 2001 and the Salford International Film Festival.

In 2022 he was announced as a Green Party candidate for the Salford and Eccles constituency at the 2024 general election.

== See also ==
- List of articles related to youth rights
