= Queer Youth Network =

UK-based LGBT nonprofit

- Founded: 1999, Manchester, United Kingdom
- Dissolved: Company and website dissolved in 2016
- Purpose: LGBTQ, queer, gay, lesbian, bisexual, transgender, asexual, intersex and questioning youth, activism
- Region served: United Kingdom, Europe
- Method: Networking, Campaigning, Advocacy, Outreach, Community Media, TV and Radio
- Website: www.queeryouth.net

The Queer Youth Network (QYN) was a national non-profit-making organisation that was run by and for lesbian, gay, bisexual and transgender (LGBTQ) young people and is based in the United Kingdom. It had an aim to represent the needs and views of younger LGBT people by campaigning for greater visibility and equal rights, as well as providing general support and information to those who are just coming out or who are experiencing homophobia.

== Founding ==
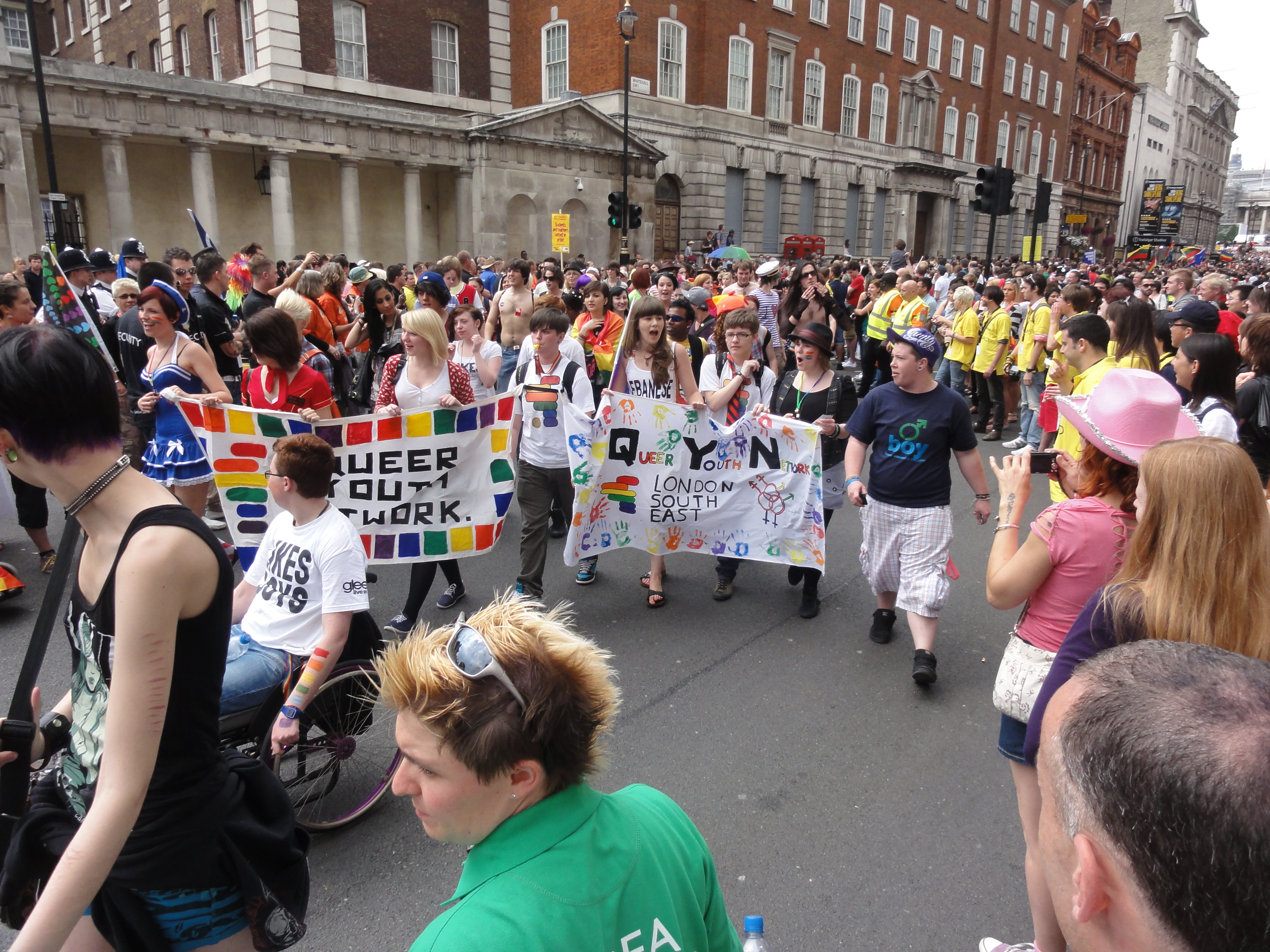
Queer Youth Network members from London and the South East marching down Whitehall as part of Pride London 2011 QYA Members with Peter Tatchell during Manchester Pride in 2003

Founded in 1999 by David Joseph Henry and CN Lester as a grass roots civil rights group, its formation was inspired by YouthSpeak and originally called the 'Queer Youth Alliance' until December 2006, and also 'Queer Youth Overground' for a short period between 1999 and 2001. In the beginning, the movement consisted of two member groups – Queer Youth Manchester (a local social support group based at the Hollywood Showbar in Manchester's gay village) and Putney High School's Gay Straight Alliance (the first of its kind in the UK). Henry and Lester got together to form a national alliance of LGBT Young People.

As many of the organisation's original aims began to be achieved (e.g. abolition of Section 28 and equalising the age of consent for gay men), the group decided to focus on youth support, and representation to ensure homophobic legislation such as that brought about by the Conservative government of the 1980s should not be re-enacted.

The first president of the organisation was David Joseph Henry, who stepped down in August 2005 to make way for new president Greg Justice, with Katherine Parlour taking over as Vice President.

With the departure of Greg Justice and Katherine Parlour, the organisation re-grouped; after a period of no clear control in 2007, the organisation changed its name to the Queer Youth Network, and with David Henry, Michael Bundock and Damian Griffiths appointed as the Network's trustees. The site and organisation has recently undergone a face-lift incorporating many features personal to individual members, core policy development and streamlined to ease confusion amongst some of the volunteer teams known as "volunqueers".

The organisation has been awarded the accolade as "Youth Group of the Year" by Pink Paper readers in both 2009 and 2010. The network's leaders were thrilled to have been voted "Best Youth Group" by Pink Paper readers and in response explained that 2009 marked the 10th Anniversary of Britain's first national organisation for LGBT young people.

== Core work ==
Instrumental in overturning Kent County Council's 'mini-Section 28' policy after a long campaign, the Network was known for its vibrant, rowdy protests and youth-led campaigns. The organisation was one of the groups in Britain to have reservations about the Government's 'civil partnerships' bill that aimed to give equal rights to same sex couples. The Queer Youth Network campaigned for the legalisation of marriage for same sex couples and as a result the organisation was one of the founding members of the Coalition for Marriage Equality (UK), together with OutRage! and the Lesbian and Gay Christian Movement. The organisation was a member of the Education for All coalition led by Stonewall set up to tackle homophobic bullying ^{3}. Leader David Joseph Henry was outspoken and controversial when speaking on the issue and accused the British education system as being an "inherently flawed fossil directly responsible for rising rates of suicide in young men, record number of children on anti-depressant drugs, spiraling anti-social behaviour in particular 'youth on youth' crime including bullying activities". The group's Scottish wing hit the headlines during a clash with Transport giant Stagecoach, that accused QYN of a 'Slur' as it mounted a boycott on its bus services following revelations of institutional homophobia.^{2}. QYN also ran the UK's only national transgender youth organisation to work with young people both under and over the age of 18, Trans Youth Network.

After a brief period of inactivity, Queer Youth Network returned to campaigning in August 2007, with the appointment of Jack Holroyde as "Campaigns Officer" and Jo McKillop as Trans Officer. Recent campaigns have included much work on transgender rights for young people, and the appointment of a new asexuality co-ordinator. After it was announced a controversial journalist (Julie Bindel) had been nominated for a Stonewall Book Award the organisation issued a statement claiming it was "Concerned and Disappointed".

QYN campaigns included calling for action on homophobic and transphobic hate crime, in particular the murder of Michael Causer in Liverpool. The organisation has also been involved in a number of controversial events surrounding Manchester Pride after calling for the annual LGBT festival to be a free event. Leader David Joseph Henry claimed festival stewards attempted to censored their "Pride Not Profit" placards. They later released a short film called "Manchester Shame" exploring arguments that Pride is no longer a community event. Shortly after the Chair of the Village Business Association, Phil Burke resigned from the board of Manchester Pride declaring "Manchester Pride purely a money-making operation" and is "run by dictators".

Leading figures in the Network are active in politics. David Henry stood as a parliamentary candidate in the 2010 General Election against former minister Hazel Blears. Jack Holroyde stood down from his position in QYN to join the Liberal Democrats and is now a leading activist in north London. Jo McKillop stood down shortly after they returned to education in 2010, and has since been active as Trans Officer for the LGBTQ+ Society at University of Roehampton, where they spearheaded a joined-up approach to trans support and inclusion and pushed for registry reform; finally winning the creation of a Trans Officer post on the SU Council in 2017.

== National Queer Youth Conference ==
The National Queer Youth Conference is hosted annually by the Queer Youth Network, in 2003 it took place in London, 2004 saw it come to Birmingham, Manchester in 2005 and to Birmingham again in 2007. The event is the largest gathering of LGBT young people in Europe and is based upon similar events held in the United States.

== Regional work ==
'Local Reps' led seven regional QYN Groups throughout England. The organisation is also responsible for the formation of a national voice for LGBT young people in Wales: LGBT Youth Wales. In Scotland it works closely with LGBT Youth Scotland, and GLYNI (Gay and Lesbian Youth Northern Ireland) who are affiliated member groups of which there are now over 200.

Queer Youth London is one of the movement's most active groups and has been run by Hollie Brock for several years. As a fully youth-led collective, it holds regular monthly meets all over Greater London and the South East.

International branches of the network have also appeared in recent years including the United States, Canada, Australia, New Zealand, India, and a Pan-African network. In Europe there are also groups covering the Benelux nations and Scandinavia.

== Queer Youth Radio ==
The Queer Youth Network launched Queer Youth Radio in the summer of 2006. Shows are put together by the group's members and youth groups across the UK who are invited to produce and star in their very own radio programmes. The station broadcasts a blend of new music and news as well as having its own Soap opera called The Group, which follows the goings on at a gay youth group and tackles unserious issues along with serious ones.

== Website issues ==
After the domain was not renewed for a week, the site returned with major issues. Users could not sign in or sign up. The news feed was broken and pages could not be viewed without signing in. However, a tweet from the Twitter account stated that the website is being redone for 2015 for a "new generation". It appears that the company behind the QYN site has been dissolved and lack of information and activity on social media indicates that the organisation is no longer operating.

== See also ==
- Athlete Ally
- Campus Pride (US)
- Gay–straight alliance (US)
- LGBT rights in the United Kingdom
- List of LGBT rights organisations
- National Union of Students LGBT Campaign (UK)
