= List of countries by youth literacy rate =

Youth literacy rate is the percentage of literates in the age group 15–24. UNESCO updates this data every year. The table below contains the data published for the year 2015 by UNESCO .

* indicates "Literacy in COUNTRY or TERRITORY" or "Education in COUNTRY or TERRITORY" links.

Country (or dependent territory)	Subregion	Region	Both	Male	Female	Year
Afghanistan *	South Asia	Asia	58.21	69.59	-	2015
Albania *	Southern Europe	Europe	99.03	98.98	-	2015
Algeria *	Northern Africa	Africa	95.59	95.65	-	2015
Angola *	Middle Africa	Africa	72.93	78.63	-	2015
Antigua and Barbuda *	Caribbean	Americas	98.91	-	-	
Argentina *	South America	Americas	99.30	99.13	-	2015
Armenia *	Western Asia	Asia	99.84	99.82	-	2015
Australia *	Australia, New Zealand	Oceania	99.99	99.99	-	2015(Approx)
Austria *	Western Europe	Europe	99.99	99.99	-	2015(Approx)
Azerbaijan *	Western Asia	Asia	99.96	99.98	-	2015
Bahamas	Caribbean	Americas	99.99	-	-	2015(Approx)
Bahrain *	Western Asia	Asia	99.76	99.78	-	2015
Bangladesh *	Southern Asia	Asia	94.18	90.61	-	2015
Barbados *	Caribbean	Americas	99.99	-	-	2015(Approx)
Belarus *	Eastern Europe	Europe	99.84	99.82	-	2015
Belgium *	Western Europe	Europe	99.99	99.99	-	2015(Approx)
Belize *	Central America	Americas	88.62	87.32	-	2015
Benin *	Western Africa	Africa	52.55	62.58	-	2015
Bhutan *	Southern Asia	Asia	88.64	-	-	2015
Bolivia *	South America	Americas	99.04	-	-	2015
Bosnia and Herzegovina *	Southern Europe	Europe	99.65	-	-	2015
Botswana *	Southern Africa	Africa	97.85	-	-	2015
Brazil *	South America	Americas	99.93	-	-	2015
Brunei *	South-eastern Asia	Asia	99.60	-	-	2015
Bulgaria *	Eastern Europe	Europe	98.20	-	-	2015
Burkina Faso *	Western Africa	Africa	45.43	-	-	2015
Burundi *	Eastern Africa	Africa	87.61	-	-	2015
Cambodia *	South-eastern Asia	Asia	91.48	-	-	2015
Cameroon *	Middle Africa	Africa	83.80	-	-	2015
Canada *	Northern America	Americas	99.99	-	-	2015(Approx)
Central African Republic *	Middle Africa	Africa	36.36	-	-	2015
Cape Verde *	Western Africa	Africa	98.34	-	-	2015
Chad *	Middle Africa	Africa	52.75	-	-	2015
Chile *	South America	Americas	99.34	-	-	2015
China *	Eastern Asia	Asia	99.73	-	-	2015
Colombia *	South America	Americas	98.66	-	-	2015
Comoros *	Eastern Africa	Africa	87.55	-	-	2015
DR Congo *	Middle Africa	Africa	80.91	-	-	2015
Congo *	Middle Africa	Africa	86.04	-	-	2015
Costa Rica *	Central America	Americas	99.32	-	-	2015
Ivory Coast *	Western Africa	Africa	50.23	-	-	2015
Croatia *	Southern Europe	Europe	99.74	-	-	2015
Cyprus *	Western Asia	Asia	99.86	-	-	2015
Czech Republic *	Eastern Europe	Europe	99.99	-	-	2015(Approx)
Denmark *	Northern Europe	Europe	99.99	-	-	2015
Djibouti *	Eastern Africa	Africa	98.91	-	-	2015
Dominica *	Caribbean	Americas	99.99	-	-	2015(Approx)
Dominican Republic *	Caribbean	Americas	97.93	-	-	2015
Ecuador *	South America	Americas	98.83	-	-	2015
Egypt *	Northern Africa	Africa	93.28	-	-	2015
El Salvador *	Central America	Americas	97.69	-	-	2015
Equatorial Guinea *	Middle Africa	Africa	98.26	-	-	2015
Eritrea *	Eastern Africa	Africa	93.25	-	-	2015
Estonia *	Northern Europe	Europe	99.97	-	-	2015
Ethiopia *	Eastern Africa	Africa	69.48	-	-	2015
Fiji *	Melanesia	Oceania	99.99	-	-	2015(Approx)
Finland *	Northern Europe	Europe	99.99	-	-	2015(Approx)
France *	Western Europe	Europe	99.99	-	-	2015(Approx)
Gabon *	Middle Africa	Africa	89.12	-	-	2015
Gambia *	Western Africa	Africa	73.18	-	-	2015
Georgia *	Western Asia	Asia	99.79	-	-	2015
Germany *	Western Europe	Europe	99.99	-	-	2015(Approx)
Ghana *	Western Africa	Africa	90.60	-	-	2015
Greece *	Southern Europe	Europe	99.45	-	-	2015
Grenada *	Caribbean	Americas	99.99	-	-	2015(Approx)
Guatemala *	Central America	Americas	93.25	-	-	2015
Guinea *	Western Africa	Africa	45.24	-	-	2015
Guinea-Bissau *	Western Africa	Africa	77.28	-	-	2015
Guyana *	South America	Americas	94.38	-	-	2015
Haiti *	Caribbean	Americas	82.07	-	-	2015
Honduras *	Central America	Americas	97.17	-	-	2015
Hong Kong *	Eastern Asia	Asia	99.99	-	-	2015(Approx)
Hungary *	Eastern Europe	Europe	98.84	-	-	2015
Iceland *	Northern Europe	Europe	99.99	-	-	2015(Approx)
India *	Southern Asia	Asia	89.65	91.83	-	2015
Indonesia *	South-eastern Asia	Asia	98.98	98.87	-	2015
Iran *	Southern Asia	Asia	98.36	98.53	-	2015
Iraq *	Western Asia	Asia	81.54	82.42	-	2015
Ireland *	Northern Europe	Europe	99.99	-	-	2015(Approx)
Israel *	Western Asia	Asia	99.99	-	-	2015(Approx)
Italy *	Southern Europe	Europe	99.93	-	-	2015
Jamaica *	Caribbean	Americas	96.50	-	-	2015
Japan *	Eastern Asia	Asia	99.99	-	-	2015(Approx)
Jordan *	Western Asia	Asia	99.22	-	-	2015
Kazakhstan *	Central Asia	Asia	99.84	-	-	2015
Kenya *	Eastern Africa	Africa	85.90	-	-	2015
Kiribati *	Micronesia	Oceania	99.99	-	-	
South Korea *	Eastern Asia	Asia	99.99	-	-	2015
Kosovo *	Eastern Europe	Europe	99.99	-	-	2015(Approx)
Kuwait *	Western Asia	Asia	99.05	-	-	2015
Kyrgyzstan *	Central Asia	Asia	99.75	-	-	2015
Laos *	South-eastern Asia	Asia	90.23	-	-	2015
Latvia *	Northern Europe	Europe	99.83	-	-	2015
Lebanon *	Western Asia	Asia	99.09	-	-	2015
Lesotho *	Southern Africa	Africa	85.09	-	-	2015
Liberia *	Western Africa	Africa	54.47	-	-	2015
Libya *	Northern Africa	Africa	99.95	-	-	2015
Lithuania *	Northern Europe	Europe	99.91	-	-	2015
Luxembourg *	Western Europe	Europe	99.99	-	-	2015(Approx)
North Macedonia *	Southern Europe	Europe	98.61	-	-	2015
Madagascar *	Eastern Africa	Africa	65.07	-	-	2015
Malawi *	Eastern Africa	Africa	75.06	-	-	2015
Malaysia *	South-eastern Asia	Asia	98.42	-	-	2015
Maldives *	Southern Asia	Asia	99.76	-	-	2015
Mali *	Western Africa	Africa	54.08	-	-	2015
Malta *	Southern Europe	Europe	99.16	-	-	2015
Marshall Islands *	Micronesia	Oceania	94.45	-	-	2015
Mauritania *	Western Africa	Africa	62.63	-	-	2015
Mauritius *	Eastern Africa	Africa	98.72	-	-	2015
Mexico *	Central America	Americas	98.74	-	-	2015
Micronesia *	Micronesia	Oceania	81.12	-	-	2015
Moldova *	Eastern Europe	Europe	99.99	-	-	2015
Mongolia *	Eastern Asia	Asia	98.61	-	-	2015
Montenegro *	Southern Europe	Europe	99.15	-	-	2015
Morocco *	Northern Africa	Africa	95.10	-	-	2015
Mozambique *	Eastern Africa	Africa	76.67	-	-	2015
Myanmar *	South-eastern Asia	Asia	96.32	-	-	2015
Namibia *	Southern Africa	Africa	89.91	-	-	2015
Nepal *	Southern Asia	Asia	89.88	-	-	2015
Netherlands *	Western Europe	Europe	99.99	-	-	2015(Approx)
New Zealand *	Australia, New Zealand	Oceania	99.99	-	-	2015(Approx)
Nicaragua *	Central America	Americas	91.62	-	-	2015
Niger *	Western Africa	Africa	26.56	-	-	2015
Nigeria *	Western Africa	Africa	72.79	-	-	2015
Norway *	Northern Europe	Europe	99.99	-	-	2015(Approx)
Oman *	Western Asia	Asia	99.13	-	-	2015
Pakistan *	Southern Asia	Asia	75.59	-	-	2015
Palau *	Micronesia	Oceania	99.37	-	-	2015
Panama *	Central America	Americas	98.13	-	-	2015
Papua New Guinea *	Melanesia	Oceania	72.35	-	-	2015
Paraguay *	South America	Americas	99.03	-	-	2015
Peru *	South America	Americas	98.94	-	-	2015
Philippines *	South-eastern Asia	Asia	97.94	-	-	2015
Poland *	Eastern Europe	Europe	99.99	-	-	2015
Portugal *	Southern Europe	Europe	99.59	-	-	2015
Qatar *	Western Asia	Asia	98.62	-	-	2015
Romania *	Eastern Europe	Europe	99.29	-	-	2015
Russia *	Eastern Europe	Europe	99.77	-	-	2015
Rwanda *	Eastern Africa	Africa	80.37	-	-	2015
Western Samoa *	Polynesia	Oceania	99.16	-	-	2015
San Marino *	Southern Europe	Europe	99.99	-	-	2015(Approx)
São Tomé and Príncipe *	Middle Africa	Africa	83.15	-	-	2015
Saudi Arabia *	Western Asia	Asia	99.34	-	-	2015
Senegal *	Western Africa	Africa	69.77	-	-	2015
Serbia *	Southern Europe	Europe	98.50	-	-	2015
Seychelles	Eastern Africa	Africa	99.05	-	-	2015
Sierra Leone *	Western Africa	Africa	67.57	-	-	2015
Singapore *	South-eastern Asia	Asia	99.90	-	-	2015
Slovakia *	Eastern Europe	Europe	99.45	-	-	2015
Slovenia *	Southern Europe	Europe	99.86	-	-	2015
Solomon Islands *	Melanesia	Oceania	90.23	-	-	2015
South Africa *	Southern Africa	Africa	99.02	-	-	2015
South Sudan *	Eastern Africa	Africa	44.33	-	-	2015
Spain *	Southern Europe	Europe	99.74	-	-	2015
Sri Lanka *	Southern Asia	Asia	98.76	-	-	2015
Saint Kitts and Nevis *	Caribbean	Americas	99.99	-	-	2015(Approx)
Saint Lucia *	Caribbean	Americas	99.99	-	-	2015(Approx)
Saint Vincent and the Grenadines *	Caribbean	Americas	99.99	-	-	2015(Approx)
Sudan *	Northern Africa	Africa	89.57	-	-	2015
Suriname *	South America	Americas	99.03	-	-	2015
Eswatini *	Southern Africa	Africa	94.77	-	-	2015
Sweden *	Northern Europe	Europe	99.99	-	-	2015
Switzerland *	Western Europe	Europe	99.99	-	-	2015
Syria *	Western Asia	Asia	96.35	-	-	2015
Taiwan *	Eastern Asia	Asia	99.99	-	-	2015(Approx)
Tajikistan *	Central Asia	Asia	99.88	-	-	2015
Tanzania *	Eastern Africa	Africa	87.31	-	-	2015
Thailand *	South-eastern Asia	Asia	98.24	-	-	2015
Timor-Leste *	South-eastern Asia	Asia	82.37	-	-	2015
Togo *	Western Africa	Africa	85.14	-	-	2015
Tonga *	Polynesia	Oceania	99.45	-	-	2015
Trinidad and Tobago *	Caribbean	Americas	99.61	-	-	2015
Tunisia *	Northern Africa	Africa	98.06	-	-	2015
Turkey *	Western Asia	Asia	99.25	-	-	2015
Turkmenistan *	Central Asia	Asia	99.84	-	-	2015
Tuvalu *	Polynesia	Oceania	64.51	-	-	2015
Uganda *	Eastern Africa	Africa	87.00	-	-	2015
Ukraine *	Eastern Europe	Europe	99.76	-	-	2015
United Arab Emirates *	Western Asia	Asia	99.43	-	-	2015
Great Britain *	Northern Europe	Europe	99.99	-	-	2015(Approx)
United States *	Northern America	Americas	99.99	-	-	2015(Approx)
Uruguay *	South America	Americas	98.91	-	-	2015
Uzbekistan *	Central Asia	Asia	99.95	-	-	2015
Vanuatu *	Melanesia	Oceania	95.74	-	-	2015
Venezuela *	South America	Americas	97.73	-	-	2015
Vietnam *	South-eastern Asia	Asia	98.06	-	-	2015
Yemen *	Western Asia	Asia	90.23	-	-	2015
Zambia *	Eastern Africa	Africa	65.76	-	-	2015
Zimbabwe *	Eastern Africa	Africa	91.73	-	-	2015
