= Free school =

Free school may refer to:

== Education ==
- A school that provides free education, not charging for attendance
- Free school (England), a type of publicly financed but independently run school in England since 2011
- Free school movement, an American education reform movement during the 1960s and 1970s that sought to change the aims of formal schooling through alternative, independent community schools
- Free skool or anarchistic free school, an autonomous, nonhierarchical space intended for educational exchange and skillsharing, especially among anarchists
- A term for independent schools in certain countries, such as Swedish free schools (Swedish: friskolor)
- Democratic school, a school where classes are voluntary

== See also ==
- Democratic education, schooling run as direct democracies
- List of democratic schools, in which students have the freedom to design their own curriculum and participate in running the school
- London Free School, a counterculture community school of UK Underground also involved with the creation of the Notting Hill Carnival
- Free School of Evanston, a school in Evanston, Illinois, US
- Freedom School, an American libertarian school in the 20th century
- Freedom Schools, temporary, alternative free schools for Southern African Americans during the 1964 Freedom Summer
