= Adam F.C. Fletcher =

Canadian scholar (born 1975)

- Born: March 3, 1975 (age 51); Calgary, Alberta, Canada
- Occupation: Educational theorist
- Website: adamfletcher.net

Adam F.C. Fletcher is a Canadian-American educational theorist, author and organizational strategist known for his work on student engagement, youth-adult partnerships, and community empowerment. He is founder of the Freechild Institute for Youth Engagement.

== Career ==
Fletcher’s career has focused on youth services, education, historiography, and consulting.

=== Youth services ===
Fletcher started his career a direct service youth worker in several nonprofit organizations and in government agencies for more than a decade. He has created frameworks for "transdisciplinary adultism," which analyze the systemic exclusion of young people across institutional hierarchies. His teaching discusses youth-adult partnerships in the context of institutional governance. Fletcher's work with agencies focuses on institutionalizing youth voice within leadership structures.

Today, his frameworks on youth empowerment have been translated into multiple languages, including Vietnamese, Portuguese, Spanish, and otherwise, where they have been utilized as foundational resources for community leadership, ethical engagement, and systems change.

=== Education ===
In 2001, Fletcher founded the Freechild Project, later known as the Freechild Institute for Youth Engagement. He also established SoundOut.org in 2002, an organization focused on student voice policy. Working with school boards and classroom teachers on institutionalizing student engagement into governance and operational structures, and has conducted workshops and presentations on youth leadership in Canada, the United States, Brazil, and the United Kingdom, Brazil and the United Kingdom. Also, Fletcher's frameworks for student involvement has been utilized by researchers to evaluate the efficacy of educational commons and student voice initiatives within European school systems.

=== Historiography ===
Fletcher is a public historian specializing in the cultural historiography of the American Midwest. His research focuses extensively on the legacy of systemic racism, redlining, and the long-term socioeconomic impacts of urban planning decisions. He is recognized for his comprehensive documentation of North Omaha, Nebraska, specifically examining how the construction of the North Freeway contributed to urban decay and the displacement of Black residents. His work in this area has been cited as a primary resource for understanding the intersection of historical racism and modern infrastructure. Fletcher’s analysis of systemic neglect has been featured in national media, including the TVOne documentary series Sins of the City (2023), where he discussed the historical context of police brutality and racial inequity in urban centers. He has collaborated with organizations such as the Movement in Omaha for Racial Equity (MORE) and the Institute for Urban Development to bridge historical research with contemporary social justice initiatives.

As an author, Fletcher has produced several books and over 900 articles documenting marginalized histories. His efforts to preserve the history of the African American community in the Midwest have received international coverage. He has also keynoted at several events in Omaha and presented throughout the city, as well as representing the community's history in local media outlets. One of his publications was written with notable Nebraska civil rights leader Preston Love, Jr..

=== Consultancy ===
As an organizational consultant, Fletcher has worked with educators, nonprofit executives, and government administrators. His consultancy focuses on democratic education and systems change. He has presented at conferences in North America, Europe, and South America. In 2025, Fletcher was recognized for his contributions to a European Union conference, as well.

Fletcher has also served as a director and advisor to several organizations including the National Youth Rights Association and others, and is a contributing editor to the Review of Education, Pedagogy and Cultural Studies, published by Taylor and Francis. He has written more than 50 publications related to education, youth work and social change. His articles have been published by the National Association for Elementary School Principals, ASCD, and elsewhere.

== Education ==
Fletcher graduated from Omaha North High School in Omaha, Nebraska. Completing his undergraduate degree in critical pedagogy and youth studies at The Evergreen State College in Olympia, Washington, he conducted graduate studies at the University of Washington in educational leadership and policy studies. He has participated in fellowships with the Points of Light Foundation and the Corporation for National Service in Washington, D.C., and Communities for Learning in New York City, New York.

== Impact ==
Organizations including the World Scout Bureau and the Library of Parliament have cited Fletcher’s frameworks in their policy documents. His work has served as a foundational resource for the World Scout Bureau's global engagement strategies. His frameworks have been cited in academic and policy contexts as well, including a 2026 article in the Berkeley Technology Law Journal regarding student agency and the Library of Parliament's 2010 recommendations for Canadian civic participation. Research identifies Fletcher as an advocate of children’s rights whose frameworks facilitate meaningful involvement. In the United Kingdom and Ireland, his "Ladder of Student Involvement" is utilized by organizations such as the Irish Second-Level Students’ Union (ISSU) to evaluate student leadership models. Additionally, his research on school connectedness has been cited as a primary framework by the United States Department of Education.

Centering on youth studies, student voice, and the development of democratic society, former United States Surgeon General David Satcher named Fletcher a "Healthy Schools Hero" for Action for Healthy Kids in 2010. In 2025, Le Monde interviewed Fletcher regarding the concept of adultism. School boards have utilized Fletcher’s "Meaningful Student Involvement" frameworks. In North America, Fletcher has been interviewed extensively on the intersection of youth leadership, critical pedagogy, and social change across multiple platforms including WNYC’s "On The Media" and on local radio, including KPFA in the Bay Area and KBOO in Portland, Oregon.

== Select bibliography ==
- Democracy Deficit Disorder: Learning Democracy with Young People (2023) ISBN 9781636673844
- Steps to Youth Leadership in Modern Times (2022) ISBN 979-8363787553
- #OmahaBlackHistory: African American People, Places and Events from the History of Omaha, Nebraska (2021) ISBN 979-8701245707
- Student Voice Revolution: The Meaningful Student Involvement Handbook (2017) ISBN 0692954449
- North Omaha History, Volume Three (2016) ISBN 978-1533361981
- North Omaha History, Volume Two (2016) ISBN 978-1539578635
- North Omaha History, Volume One (2016) ISBN 978-1533361981
- Facing Adultism (2015) ISBN 978-1517641238
- The Guide to Student Voice, 2nd edition. (2014) ISBN 0692217320
- The Practice of Youth Engagement (2014) ISBN 1501001752
- School Boards of the Future: A Guide to Students as Education Decision-Makers (2014) ISBN 1502983443
- The Freechild Project Guide to Youth-Driven Programming. (2013) ISBN 1482607727
- Suffering Love, Laughing at Myself (2013) ISBN 1492244651
- SoundOut Student Voice Curriculum. (2007) ISBN 1483941396
