= Youth in the United Kingdom =

Youth in the United Kingdom refers to an age group of British citizens in the demographics of the United Kingdom. 12% of the United Kingdom's citizens are in the age range of 10 to 19.

== Population ==
As of 2024, people aged 10 through 19 make up 12% of the total population of the United Kingdom at ~8 million individuals; there are a further ~12 million individuals in the age range of 10 through 24. In March 2023, it was reported that in England and Wales, ~17.3 million people, or 29% of the jurisdiction's population, was below the age of 25.

In medieval England, the three adolescent age ranges of 10-13, 14-16, and 17-19 were relatively balanced in population. During this time, approximately 33% of the English population was under the age of 14.

== History ==
=== Middle Ages ===
During the Middle Ages in England, infants and youth under the age of seven had a high mortality rate of around 25%; this is believed to have been caused by the factors of diseases and infections such as smallpox, along with additional reasons such as malnutrition. This high childhood death rate meant that women had to have more children It is for this reason that even though women had four or five children on average, the population did not rapidly grow. These high mortality rates were also present in Medieval Scotland.

Children in the English Middle Ages usually started to work seriously at the time when puberty began (around 12-14). Although the average age for an apprentice to start was at twelve years old, children as young as 7 came to England to work as apprentices. Both deliberate and accidental incidents, some fatal, occurred among child workers in medieval England; in these times, there were 10 recorded incidents of children drowning and multiple incidents that involved mistreatment of child workers, including beatings and neglect.

The origins of education in medieval England can be found in the 7th century; the education system back then trained boys to be monks or secular clergy, while girls were trained to be nuns. In the final years of the 9th century, education additionally consisted of literacy in English over the formerly taught Latin. The earliest English schools that were open to the public as well as free-standing came about in the 1070s, and soon many more were constructed. By the end of the 12th century, education included learning the Latin alphabet; however, very few schoolchildren progressed to learn any grammatical conventions, instead using this basic knowledge to read in English or French.

In the Middle Ages, English children commonly wore clothing similar to an adult's but smaller in size. Infants wore a wrapping. Affluent medieval English families that could afford infant beds and walking frames also commonly purchased metal toys and dolls for their children. Although the British youth's spoken culture wasn't preserved until the 14th century, it is known that sports such as association football and archery were played along with multiple medieval activities and sports.

=== Industrial Revolution ===
During the British Industrial Revolution, many children were laborers in the agricultural and manufacturing sectors. Since education was not compulsory and cost money, many children did not attend school; as a result, about half of the children who would otherwise be going to school, worked full-time jobs. The average age to start working during this time period was eight years old, and a majority of tactics used when working with children did not reward good behavior (only 4% did) but rather punished bad behavior (95% did).

By the year 1830, over 50% of the British workforce consisted of child workers. Children worked 12- to 16-hour shifts, many of which were served in unclean and overcrowded environments. Many children fell asleep at their workstations and consequentially faced fatal injuries or severe harm, including crushing and other physical trauma.

== Mental health ==
In 2020, it was reported that one in six English children and teenagers aged 5-16 were experiencing a mental illness; this was an increase from the previous year. In 2017 and 2018, about 33% of British 16-24-year-olds showed signs of anxiety or depression, up from 26% a year prior.

According to the British charity Mental Health Foundation, half of all mental health issues begin by age 14, with a further three-fourths of all mental health problems starting by age 24.

== Youth unemployment ==
Statistics for June 2010 show that there are 926,000 young people under the age of 25 who are unemployed which equates to an unemployment rate of 19.6% among young people. This is the highest youth unemployment rate in 17 years. In November 2011 youth unemployment hit 1.02 million, but had fallen to 767,000 by August 2014. In August 2024, the rate of unemployment for ages 16-24 was reported to be at 14.8%; it was also reported that ~872,000 youth aged 16-24 were not enrolled in any form of education or working any full-time job, and out of that group, a large portion was noted as economically inactive, and another notable amount of completely unemployed people was recorded. The high levels of youth unemployment in the United Kingdom have led some politicians and media commentators to talk of a "lost generation".
