= Action for Healthy Kids =

US-based nonprofit organization

- Formation: 2002
- Type: Youth organization
- Legal status: Non-profit organization
- Headquarters: Chicago, IL
- Location: United States
- Region served: All 50 US states
- CEO: Rob Bisceglie
- Website: www.actionforhealthykids.org

Action for Healthy Kids is a United States–based nonprofit organization focused on child heath. The organization was founded in 2002. It focuses on increasing access to healthy foods and physical activity, supporting social emotional learning, and engaging parents, caregivers and community members to transform student health, well-being and learning. Former U.S. Surgeon General David Satcher is the founding chair of the organization. Through funding opportunities and programmatic support, Action for Healthy Kids provides schools all the information and resources they need to implement successful and sustainable school health programs.

Action for Healthy Kids is the organizational home of Active Schools, a program to prioritize physical education and physical activity in schools.
