= Human rights and youth sport =

Sports are activities involving physical exertion and skill, in which a team compete against another as a form of entertainment. The universality of sport allows it to encompass several different rights. Most sporting events have a huge impact on human rights. Human rights are rights that are believed to belong to justifiably every person. In particular youth sport which concerns the rights of children. The practice of sport is beneficial to children as it can have a positive impact on their physical, mental, psycho-motor and social development skills. Sport is helpful in a human rights context as it encourages the integration of children from different cultural or economic backgrounds, those with disabilities and helps promote gender equality.

The practice of sport is seen to be important to the development of young people as it fosters their physical and emotional health and builds valuable social connections. It offers opportunities for play and self-expression that is beneficial especially for young people with few other opportunities. Within schools physical education is a vital component of quality education as it promotes physical activity and can help improve academic performance.

== International conventions and organisations ==
=== Convention on the Rights of the Child ===
The United Nations Convention on the Rights of the Child 1990 does not include any direct reference to sports. The articles in the Convention are applicable in the wider context of youth sport. Article 31 does provide some reference in relation to the rights of the child when it comes to cultural, artistic, recreational and leisure activity.

Sport and games are an asset in reaching the objectives found in the Convention. Youth sport can help to combat discrimination by promoting the integration of race, gender, religion, children from different economic and social backgrounds, age and ability. Provide social and participative opportunities for children and also provide access to those with disabilities, from different social or economic situations. By providing sport in schools or at a community based level it can motivate and stimulate children towards achievement, promote public health and encourage fair play and the channelling of certain emotions and violence.

=== United Nations Office for Sport Development and Peace ===
The United Nations Office Sport Development and Peace, (UNOSDP) have implemented strategies to foster youth development in sport. They address the areas of child protection in sport and sport to strengthen child and youth education. The United Nations Inter-Agency Task Force on Sport for Development and Peace 2003 defines sport for development as "all forms of physical activity that contribute to physical fitness, mental well-being and social interaction, such as play, recreation, organised or competitive sport, and indigenous sports.” The UNOSDP have instigated these strategies as children should have the opportunity to take part in sport at all levels in a safe, secure and positive environment as children can be vulnerable to being influenced in sport and child protection is important.

=== Council of Europe ===
The Council of Europe is one of the most active intergovernmental institutions for the protection of human rights of athletes and youth. The Council has established norms and standards which encourage member states to adopt laws, policies and programmes. The Council of Europe has developed the 1992 European Sports Charter with the view to the promotion of sport as an important factor in human development and provides that Governments should take the steps necessary to apply the provisions of the Charter in accordance with the principles set out in the Code of Sports Ethics set out by the Council. This Charter will help to enable every individual to participate in sport and to ensure that all young people should have the opportunity to receive physical education instruction and the opportunity to acquire basic sports skills. The Council wants to ensure that everyone has the opportunity to take part in sport and physical recreation in a safe and healthy environment and in co-operation with the appropriate sports organisations. It will also look to ensure that everyone with the interest and ability should have the opportunity to improve their standard of performance in sport and reach levels of personal achievement and/or publicly recognised levels of excellence. The Charter will also help to protect and develop the moral and ethical aspects of sport and promote the human dignity and safety of those involved in sport, by safeguarding sport, sportsmen and women from exploitation for political, commercial and financial gain and from practices that are abusive or degrading including the abuse of drugs and the sexual harassment and abuse of children, young people and women.

== Child protection ==
Sport is a physical activity which is most readily identified with youth as there has been an increase in youth involvement in high performance sports due to early identification of athletic talent and early specialisation. There is a need for child’s rights to be protected in organised sports as abuses can take place. The United Nations Office on Sport for Development and Peace (UNOSDP) has a strategy in place to protect the rights of the child when it comes to abuse. The most commonly abused human rights in relation to youth sport recognised by the UNOSDP found in conjunction with 1990 Convention on the Rights of the Child are the right to health (Article 24), the right to protection from all forms of violence and maltreatment (Article 19), the right to protection from trafficking (Article 11), the right to education (Article 23) and the right to rest (Article 31.1). The World Health Organization report in 1999 defined child abuses as "all forms of physical and/or emotional ill treatment, sexual abuses, neglect or negligent treatment or commercial or other exploitation, resulting in actual or potential harm to the child’s health, survival, development or dignity in the context of a relationship of responsibility, trust or power.” The most common forms of abuse in youth sport are child trafficking and labour, physical abuse, peer violence, physical violence by adults including physical punishment, violence due to participation in competitions, sexual abuse and harassment. Also emotional and psychological abuse such as neglect and bullying. Abuse can lead to other problems which can have lifelong effects on the child such as physical injuries, sexual health problems, depression, low self-esteem, eating and sleeping disorders, post-traumatic stress disorder and suicide.

Abuses in youth sport can happen for numerous reasons. Abuses can occur because children feel a sense of dependency. Children find themselves in unique situations where they often train with those who are older or with an adult coach therefore the environment they are in creates a pseudo family within which there are certain expectations and pressures placed on them which can create strong emotions and they form a dependency to the adults in charge. Training to please, the psychological development of the child often impulses them to train excessively and do almost anything to please adults and achieve in their chosen sport which can make them vulnerable to the possibility of abuse. Lack of qualified trainer’s, often trainers are sports people who may have gone through a professional sports career but may not have the necessary coach training required to deal with children. Lack of international standards, the UNOSDP is working to develop international standards with respect to human rights to protect children in sports as the lack of international standards can lead to human rights abuses of children in sport.

=== Combating human rights violations ===
In order to move forward to prevent human rights violations the UNOSDP International Working Group propose that States should implement policies that educate children, parents and coaches, along with developing policies and international standards to combat human rights abuses in youth sport. Educating children about the risks of abuse in sport, their rights and whom to ask for help will help combat breaches of human rights and abuse. The Canadian Red Cross RespectedED teaches children and adults how healthy relationships look and feel, detecting signs of abuse or harassment and how to get help. Raising awareness of abuse to parents by informing parents of the possible harms that intensive training can do to their children, their role and responsibilities, and how they can contribute to the prevention of child abuse in sport. Targeting coaches by providing training and education to coaches on ethics in sport and acceptable training techniques as well as screening for potential offenders which should help to mitigate child abuse. This provides children with the appropriate direction and guidance and allows for competent supervision. Developing practices to protect children and youth, and also developing policies that concern sport participation, training and competition should help recognise and prioritise the needs and interests of the child or youth at all times.

The development of a child-centered sports system which aims at developing competitive talent among athletes and fulfilling their human rights and dignity is a way of enabling children to develop holistically in a sports system. A child sensitive system to combat human rights violations would look at promoting equality, non-discrimination and fairness. Addressing the best interests of the child which allows them to be included in any decisions being made but also allows others to focus on the impact the potential situation may have on the child. Also recognising the child as the subject of rights and their ability to exercise rights makes them less vulnerable to abuse and exploitation. Evaluating the evolving capacities of the child as children are constantly developing therefore consideration has to be given to age, maturity and capacity for discernment. All young athletes are different and cannot compete at the same levels therefore the developmental capacities need to be addressed. Implementing health standards for all athletes which address physical, psychological, spiritual, social and cultural aspects.
