= Evolving capacities =

Child-rights principle recognising children's developing autonomy

Evolving capacities is the concept in which education, child development and youth development programs led by adults take into account the capacities of the child or youth to exercise rights on their own behalf. It is also directly linked to the right to be heard, requiring adults to be mindful of their responsibilities to respect children's rights, protect them from harm, and provide opportunities so they can exercise their rights. The concept of evolving capacities is employed internationally as a direct alternative to popular concepts of child and youth development.

== About ==
The concept of evolving capacities of the child first emerged in international law through the Convention on the Rights of the Child. It stems from the recognition that childhood is not a single, fixed, universal experience and that their lives require different degrees of protection, provision, prevention, and participation at different stages of their lives.

The notion of evolving capacities is reflected in Article Five of the Convention, which says that:

States Parties shall respect the responsibilities, rights and duties of parents or, where applicable, the members of the extended family or community as provided for by local custom, legal guardians or other persons legally responsible for the child, to provide, in a manner consistent with the evolving capacities of the child, appropriate direction and guidance in the exercise by the child of the rights recognized in the present Convention.

Article twelve also addresses evolving capacities, stating that:

States Parties shall assure to the child who is capable of forming his or her own views the right to express those views freely in all matters affecting the child, the views of the child being given due weight in accordance with the age and maturity of the child. For this purpose, the child shall in particular be provided the opportunity to be heard in any judicial and administrative proceedings affecting the child, either directly, or through a representative or an appropriate body, in a manner consistent with the procedural rules of national law.

Evolving capacities recognizes that as children acquire enhanced competencies there is less need for protection and a greater possibility that they can take responsibility for decisions affecting their lives. It is presupposed by the gradualist conception of children's rights, which suggests that children move progressively from a situation in which their rights primarily protect their interests to one in which their rights primarily protect their choices. The Convention allows for the recognition that children in different environments and cultures, and faced with diverse life experiences, will acquire competencies at different ages. This is the reason why the Committee on the Rights of the Child has sought information on minimum legal ages for legal and medical counseling or medical treatment without parental consent, creating and joining associations, and participating in administrative and judicial proceedings when it developed the guidelines relating to Article 1 of the Convention on the Rights of the Child.

The Canadian International Development Agency reports that there are three primary points to consider regarding evolving capacities:

1. Evolving capacities should be understood in the context of where children grow;
2. Evolving capacities should grow out of respect for the competencies young people already have, and;
3. Adults should protect young people from experiences and decisions they have not yet acquired the capacity to take responsibility for.

Adequate and systematic documentation is an example of initiatives that integrate the concept of evolving capacities in education. The strategy can support teacher determine how learners' capacities evolve over time and develop necessary interventions and responses to meaningfully address individual children's right to development.

Evolving capacities can be understood in two different ways. The first is that it is a limitation of the rights exercised by children while the second interprets it as a stimulant for the recognition of the special capacities of children and their promotion. As an interpretative principle, evolving capacities operates to ensure that other provisions in the Convention on the Rights of the Child are interpreted in a way that recognizes and fosters respect for the evolving capacities of the child. This is demonstrated in the way the Committee on the Rights of the Child drew an interpretative link between article 5 and article 29(1), connecting a child's education with his or her dignity and rights.

== See also ==
- Youth voice
- Intergenerational equity
- Youth/adult partnerships
