= Youth in Denmark =

Youth in Denmark includes individuals 15 to 25 years old. Denmark's demographic development resembles other western European countries with an increasing elderly population and low birth rate. Hence, youth in Denmark only comprise 13% of Denmark's 5,556,452 population consisting of 367,927 males and 352,872 females. The sex ratio is 1.04 male/female.

During youth, families typically embrace an individualistic self-development. Danes begin to make decisions in regards to health and educational options. The government's underlying institutional features allow youth to face a lower risk of long term unemployment compared to other countries. Consuming alcohol and exercising regularly are prominent activities. Different values and diverse contexts guide youth practices.

== Family ==
In the late modern family, trust and negotiation are important strategies to build a respectful and honoring relationship. Generally speaking, parents do not make decisions for youth without explaining the rationale and the youth comprehending. Parents prepare youth to be independent and responsible individuals by encouraging emancipation from the family. Parents do not impose strict rules interfering with youth freedom. Youth setting boundaries on providing information to parents is acceptable. The ideal is to maintain a continuous and friction free dialogue between parents and youth.

According to a study by sociologist Torsten Kolind, rules by parents of mainstream and counterculture youth differ. Mainstream parents' rules are indefinite, negotiable, and entail unspoken expectations. As a result, rules set are only broken to a degree by youth. Passing the fine line results in feelings of guilt and abused parental trust. Parents' rules of counterculture youth are defined and non-negotiable. Yet, counterculture youth do not reflect on these rules as important and do not have a guilty conscience when breaking the rules.

== Education ==
Primary, secondary, and university education in Denmark is free. Ten years of school is compulsory for children ages 6 to 16. After completing their compulsory education, youth branch off onto different routes. Half of the students opt for an additional eleventh year. Twenty-three percent stop their educational career, while 77% attend a general academic secondary school or a vocational training program for particular professions.

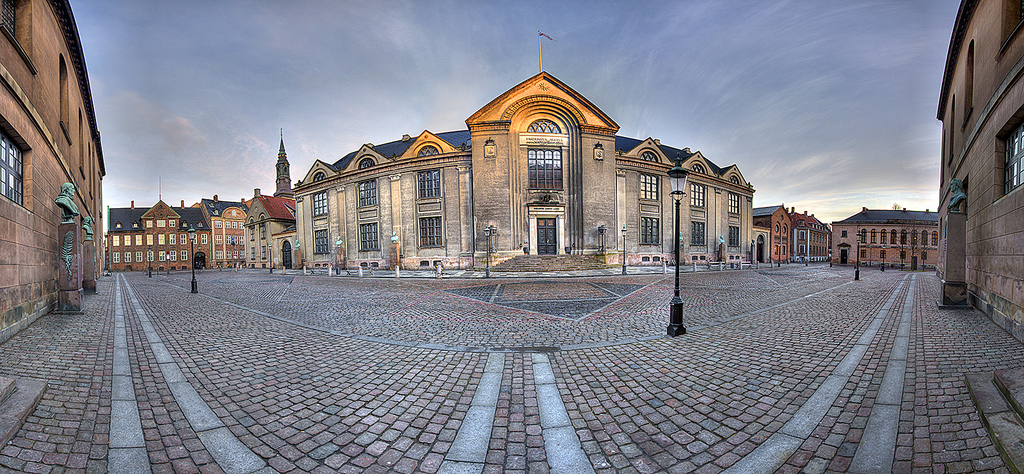
The main building at the University of Copenhagen

After attending secondary education in Denmark for three years, youth may enroll in a university. University programs include: sociology, economics, architecture, medicine, and pharmacy. There are 12 universities, including the University of Copenhagen, Aarhus University, Odense University, and Roskilde University.

Compared to European peers, youth are older when they enter and graduate from tertiary education. The average age to start a bachelor's degree at a university was 21.8 in 2000 and 21.6 in 2006. The delay to begin studying is due to students traveling abroad, taking the voluntary tenth grade, working in a café, or enjoying their time in other ways while considering what to do. The average age to graduate was 25.0 in 2000 and 25.2 in 2005. Danish students frequently change their study plan. Danes faced with difficulties at university reorient themselves towards shorter and less demanding programs.

Denmark provides vocational education and training programs for those aged 16 and older. Vocational education typically consists of two to four years. It includes a mixture of theoretical courses with practical training in apprenticeships. The vocational education system is divided into two parts: the basic course and main course. The basic course ranging from 10 to 60 weeks includes attending classes with compulsory and optional subjects. The optional subjects provide the student with opportunities to acquire qualifications. The length of the basic course varies with the program. For the main course, students find a contract with a firm for an apprenticeship for two to three years. Firms receive subsidies to hire and train apprentices. The cost for an apprentice is half the cost for an ordinary employee. The wage received by an apprentice is attractive for a young person, being an average 60% higher than the state education grant. If they are not able to find an apprenticeship contract, youth find themselves in another program or continue in general upper secondary education programs.

Denmark performs poorly in terms of school drop out rates, and therefore, the government is committed to reducing the numbers. Youth aged 20–24 with no upper secondary education reached 18.6% in 2008, which is slightly above the Organisation for Economic Co-operation and Development (OECD) average. Other European countries, such as Poland, Czech Republic, and Slovak Republic, drop out rates range between 6–7%. Drop out rates in nearby Nordic countries Sweden stands at 9.5% and Finland stands at 10.2%. The government decided 95% of each youth cohort should have at least upper secondary education by 2015. Career education and guidance offered by schools are working to combat drop outs. Career education and guidance begins at schools in grade 6 and continues until grade 9 or 10 and provides opportunities for students to familiarize themselves with upper secondary education program demands. A personal education portfolio follows each student into secondary education and serves as a foundation for talks about future education and career planning.

== Employment ==
As of July 2013, the unemployment rate for 16- to 24-year-olds stood at 5.2%. In comparison to other countries, the rate is low. Youth unemployment stood at 16% in the United States and 11.6% in Hong Kong in September 2013. In 2008, 48% of students age 16 and 70% of students ages 23–24 held jobs. The average age of first employment is 22 years old. Typically, young Danes will spend 4.5 years out of the first five years of leaving education in employment. This is higher than the 4.4 years recorded in Australia, Switzerland, and Netherlands.

In order for unemployed Danes to collect insurance benefits, one must be registered as unemployed at Denmark’s Public Employment Service (PES) and actively search for a job. PES offers programs to combat youth unemployment. One package offered to 18- to 19-year-olds includes an interview one week after applying for welfare benefits, a job-search training course within the first two weeks, and an educational opportunity or work placement offered no later than one month after the beginning of the unemployed period. For 18- to 30-year-olds, PES is obliged to refer new graduates under 30 to a private provider after six weeks of unemployment.

== Health ==
Health care in Denmark allows young Danes to enjoy excellent health. Public health programs are directed against infectious diseases. Public health nurses provide free advice and assistance to young mothers.

=== Coverage options ===
National and local authorities and employers pay for the cost of the health care system. Since 1973, Danes over the age of 15 choose between two coverage options: Group 1 or Group 2. Group 1 members choose their own general practitioner and have free general preventative, diagnostic, and curative services. Their general practitioner must refer them to medical specialities, including physiotherapy and hospital treatments. Group 2 members are not required to have their own general practitioners and can consult specialists without referral. However, patients pay a part of their fees. Private health insurance is also available.

=== Dental care ===
For youth eighteen and younger, dental care access is free. Oral health care is provided by a municipal dental health service or at a private practice dentist on a fee-for-service basis paid by the municipalities. The 1986 Act on Dental Care provides health promotion, systematic prevention, and curative care free of charge for those eighteen and younger. Youth dental care service includes recurrent check-ups and treatment. Dental health care for those over eighteen is by provided by private dental practitioners. Citizens take responsibility for a part of the payments.

=== Reproductive concerns ===
By fifteen, 38% of females and 38% of males are sexually active. There are no markedly differences between gender compared to Greenland and Romania. In Greenland, 71% females and 46% males are sexually active, and in Romania, 17% females and 48% males are sexually active. Schools provide sex education, including the use of contraceptives. Sex education includes a visit to a family planning clinic.

Females over 18 years of age have access to free of charge pregnancy terminations within the first 12 weeks of pregnancy. A regional abortion and sterilization council may give an exemption to terminating a pregnancy after the first 12 weeks due to special circumstances, such as the pregnant woman being too young and immature to take care of the baby. Pregnant women have access to antenatal services by midwives, general practitioners, or obstetricians in hospital obstetric departments. Since 2010, screening of pregnant women for hepatitis B, HIV, and syphilis was made mandatory.

Since 2008-2009, the human papilloma virus (HPV) vaccine has been offered free of charge to females at the age of 12. Since 2012, the HPV vaccine is offered free of charge for females up to the age of 26.

=== Causes of mortality ===
The highest incident of sudden cardiac death (SCD) in youth is due to ischemic heart disease. According to a study on SCD between 2000–2006, 79% of youth in the case group had symptoms within 12 months of death. Symptoms included angina and dyspnoea.

In 35–40% of unexplained youth deaths, genetic alterations in genes involved in the cardiac action potential is the cause. Genes alter the function of proteins and thus change the properties of the ion channel. The ion fluxes lead to arrhythmia.

In 2012, road traffic accidents caused 31 fatalities of 18-24 year olds.

== Culture ==
=== Alcohol consumption ===
Drinking alcohol is a central component of Danish youth life. Young Danes are at the top of the European list of early intoxication. By 16, 94% have consumed alcohol and 73% have been drunk. Between 15 and 19 years old, 92% have been drunk at least once in their lives. This is in part of a liberal alcohol culture - the legal age for buying alcohol is 16, and it is 18 years of age to buy alcohol stronger than 16,4% volume. Alcohol is used to relax, be sociable, and identify with others. Many drink to gain approval and social acceptance from peers. Not participating in drinking alcohol can lead to social exclusion because drinking and popularity are connected.

Mainstream and counterculture youth drinking practices differ. Learning to be in control of intoxication is a strategy characteristic of mainstream youth. They drink in safe settings in a controlled manner. Mainstream youth tend to reject others who are too wild, drink with no limits, or go too far. To counterculture youth, drinking excessively is a central value. Counterculture youth aim to experience out of control situations.

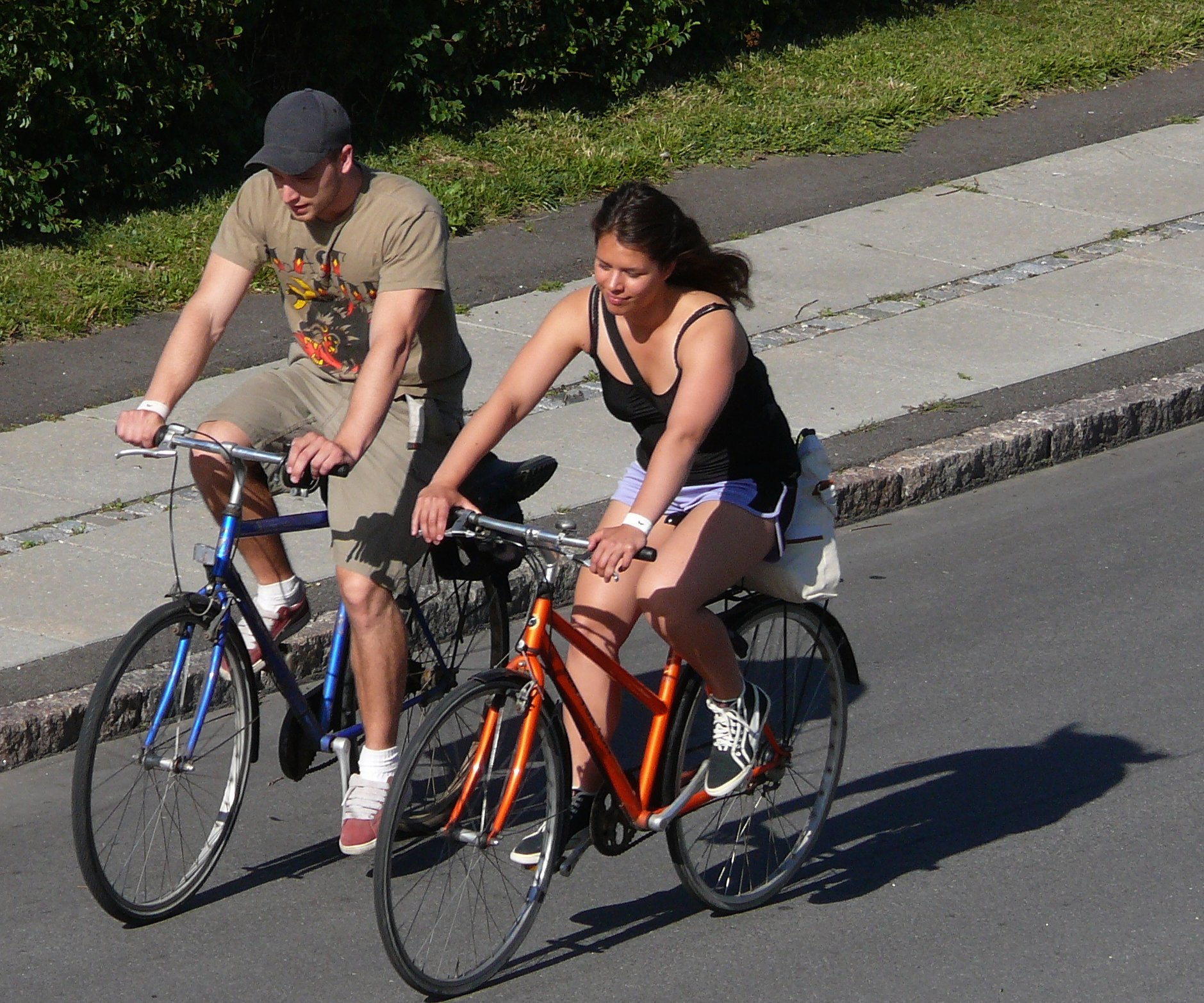
Danish youth enjoy cycling.

=== Language ===
The use of English is frequent among young people under 25. English is the predominant second language and is in the school curriculum from the first grade. Roughly 90% of 15- to 21-year-olds speak English with other Danes at least once per week. Youth code switch from Danish to English with friends and classmates. English phrases or words are spoken in between Danish words. Codeswitching is a marker of youth identity and sign of opposition to adult culture. Youth use their language style to differ from adults.

=== Sports ===
Popular sports in Denmark include cycling, swimming, football, badminton, and jogging. Cycling is an important part of the culture due to cycling routes that run thousands of kilometers. Schools offer football, handball, basketball, table tennis, and gymnastic teams to students. Young Danish males prefer football, handball, and badminton, while females prefer gymnastics, badminton, horseback riding, handball, and swimming.
