= Escape from Childhood =

1974 book by John Holt

Escape from Childhood: The Needs and Rights of Children
- First edition cover
- Author: John Holt
- Published: 1974 (E. P. Dutton)
- ISBN: 978-0-345-24434-5

Escape from Childhood: The Needs and Rights of Children is a book by American author and educator John Holt.

For most of John Holt’s career as an author he wrote primarily about schooling. Escape from Childhood still holds ties to the messages of his other books, but it focuses on Holt's thoughts and beliefs about the rights of children in society in general rather than schooling specifically. The book advocates for youth rights and against adultism and ephebiphobia, as evidenced in Holt's opening statement: "I propose...that the rights, privileges, duties of adult citizens be made available to any young person, of whatever age, who wants to make use of them."
