= Article 12 (organisation) =

English youth rights organisation

Article 12 is a youth-led children's rights organisation based in England. Its main aim was to ensure the implementation of the United Nations Convention on the Rights of the Child (UNCRC), specifically Article 12. The group, run by a steering committee, worked to ensure the rights of young people were heard by decision makers. It was founded after a young people's rights conference in Greenwich, London, and was run by and for young people aged 18 and under. The administrative duties of Article 12 were run by Children's Rights Alliance for England (CRAE).

One of the group's most high-profile campaigns was "Stop Smacking Us", which challenged the physical punishment of children. The campaign led to a rally in Westminster to 10 Downing Street with hundreds of children. Its members have represented the United Kingdom at several United Nations sessions. In 1999, Daisy Langmaid and David Joseph Henry took part in 10th commemorative meeting of the UNCRC in Geneva. In 2001, James Anderson and Lucy Mason took part in the Special Session on Children in New York. Many of its key members have gone on to become human rights activists.

In 2000, Article 12 produced a report titled called Respect investigating "how well Article 12 of the UN Convention on the Rights of the Child is put into Practice across the UK". The report was put together by the members of CR2000 (Children's Rights 2000). The organisation conducted interviews and research with children in schools and youth groups, to gather their opinions and views on how well their rights were upheld and how much their opinions were heard.

The organisation is no longer active but its work continues through CRAE and work of former members who continue to work in the youth rights movement.
