= Youth literature =

Youth literature may refer to:

- Children's and young adult literature
  - Young adult literature
  - Children's literature
