= Freechild Institute for Youth Engagement =

Nonprofit organization

The Freechild Institute for Youth Engagement is a nonprofit organization focused on creating connections between adults and young people through programs, technical assistance, publications, training, and curriculum. Adam Fletcher is the executive director, and the institute is located in Olympia, Washington. The School Library Journal has said Freechild's website is, "By far the largest repository of projects, ideas, and organizational links, this resource provides more than adequate information to help students brainstorm ideas in order to start their own initiatives."

== History ==
Fletcher started the organization as "The Freechild Project" in 2001. The organization changed its name to Freechild Institute for Youth Engagement in January 2018.

== Activities ==
The mission of Freechild is "to advocate, inform, and celebrate social change led by and with young people around the world, particularly those who have been historically denied the right to participate. They provide examples and resources to youth and their adult allies." The group advocates "radical democracy."

Freechild believes it is completely unethical to exclude young people from participating in the actions that affect them most. Their programs include service-learning, topic-specific workshops and activist group incubation. The group consults with local and national nonprofit groups in strategic planning, capacity building and product development with youth empowerment at the center of their priorities. They also perform networking services through conferences and online communications.

The organization is coordinated by one full-time staff member, offers activities through a network of trainers, and is advised by youth and adult experts from across the US. The website SoundOut.org is one of their projects. The director of Freechild also talks with the media about youth.

== See also ==
- National Youth Rights Association
- Youth
- Youth suffrage
- Youth rights
- Age of candidacy
