= Youth participation =

Active engagement of youth in communities

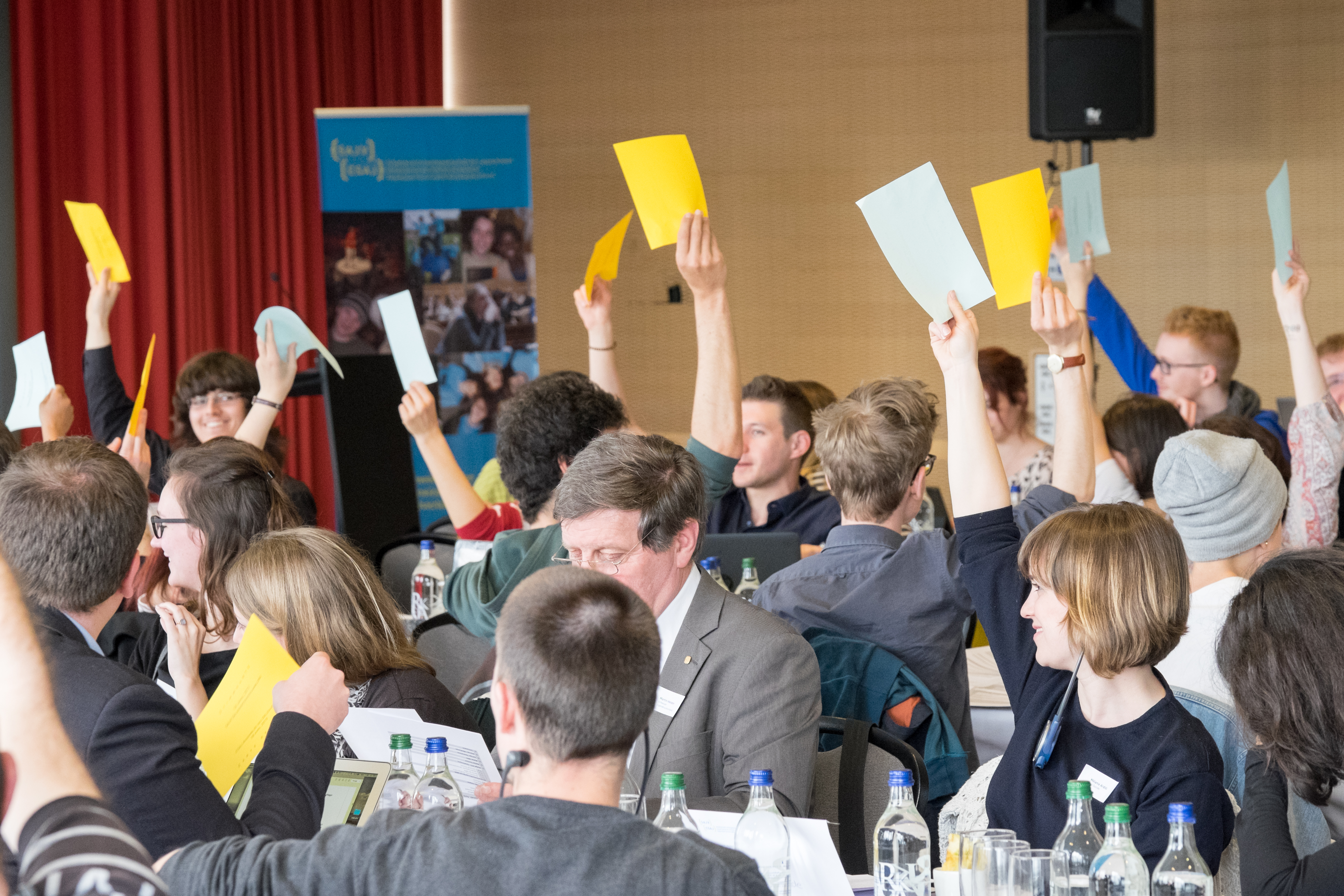

Youth participation is the active engagement of young people throughout their own communities. It is often used as a shorthand for youth participation in any many forms, including decision-making, sports, schools and any activity where young people are not historically engaged.

== Coinage ==
Youth participation, also called youth involvement, has been used by government agencies, researchers, educators, and others to define and examine the active engagement of young people in schools, sports, government, community development and economic activity.

In 1975, the National Commission on Resources for Youth in the United States defined youth participation as:

...Youth participation is the involving of youth in responsible, challenging action that meets genuine needs, with opportunities for planning and/or decision-making affecting others in an activity whose impact or consequence is extended to others— i.e., outside or beyond the youth participants themselves. Other desirable features of youth participation are provision for critical reflection on the participatory activity and the opportunity for group effort toward a common goal.

In 1995, the Canadian Mental Health Association (CMHA) established a definition of meaningful youth participation as:

Meaningful youth participation involves recognizing and nurturing the strengths, interests, and abilities of young people through the provision of real opportunities for youth to become involved in decisions that affect them at individual and systemic levels.

In 2006 the Commonwealth Youth Programme and UNICEF remarked: "As there are many types of developmental processes, cultures and unique individuals in the world, participation is not any one phenomenon. There are various definitions of participation. A basic concept of participation however, is that people are free to involve themselves in social and developmental processes and that self-involvement is active, voluntary and informed."

The platform for youth to get involved has continued to increase in contemporary society, however these opportunities cannot be seen to be amplifying the voice of youth in society.

== International Law ==
The United Nations Convention of the Rights of the Child (1989) formally enshrines the rights of children and young people to participate. Article 12.1 provides: “States Parties shall assure to the child who is capable of forming his or her own views the right to express those views freely in all matters affecting the child, the views of the child being given due weight in accordance with the age and maturity of the child.”

== Models ==
There are various models of youth participation which can be followed when attempting to get young people involved with decision making or acting for change.

Marc Jans and Kurt De Backer present the Triangle of Youth Participation. This suggests that young people will actively engage with society when presented with three specific dimensions; firstly they must have something to challenge. Following this, they must feel they have the capacity to make a difference and finally must be able to connect with others in order to tackle the issue effectively.

Hart’s Ladder of Participation is a model that can be used when developing and working on youth participation projects. It aims to enable young people to take an active part in decision making, and give them the opportunity to have a 'voice' in society.

Hart states there are 8 steps on the 'Ladder of Participation" The first three steps, manipulation, decoration and tokenism, are considered not be engaging young people in active youth participation, but instead provide a pathway to move up onto the other stages of youth participation. The following five steps after this look at how to fully integrate young people into the decision making process and how to get them actively involved. These steps evolve in that the next step the adult organize an event for young people to volunteer in (young people assigned but not informed). Following this the young people's opinions will have some influence on decisions made and they will receive feedback on these opinions (Young people are consulted and informed). Next step involves adults coming up with the initial idea, and young people taking the necessary steps to implement it with their own ideas and organization (Adult-initiated, shared power with young people). The penultimate step look at young people having full power and creative license over their ideas and projects (Young people lead and initiated action). The final step looks at the amalgamation of some of the final few steps, in that the young people initiate the idea and invite adults to join in, thus leading to an equal partnership. (Young people and adult share decision making.)

== Examples ==
In these forms, youth participation activities may include:

- Youth councils
- Participatory action research
- Youth-led media
- Youth-targeted political organizations

Youth participation often requires some measure of student voice or youth voice, as well as youth/adult partnerships. Results are often measured by youth development goals, academic outcomes or returns on social capital. They may take the form of civic engagement, youth rights or intergenerational equity.

== Youth participation in education ==
Youth participation in education policymaking includes formal representation on decision-making bodies and consultation on legislation and policy. Demands for greater participation form part of a wider movement for youth agency that has developed over three decades. In 2022, the Youth Declaration at the Transforming Education Summit called on national decision-makers to invest in youth and student leadership and support their representation.

A report by the Global Education Monitoring (GEM) Report drawing on responses from 93 governments found that one-third reported a formal requirement to involve youth or students in education decision-making through formal bodies. Three-quarters had consulted young people on education legislation or policy during the preceding three years. Formal mechanisms were more common in wealthier countries and those with ageing populations. Governments reported that consultation had informed policies on inclusion, well-being, safety and curriculum reform.

A parallel survey of 101 youth and student organizations carried out by the GEM Report, in which European countries were overrepresented, found that fewer than one-third felt frequently engaged, while one-fifth felt valued or in a collaborative relationship with decision-makers. Reported barriers included limited influence, short consultation periods, difficulties engaging members and insufficient resources. The report identified formal representation, inclusive participation, institutional support and consideration of participants’ feedback as factors supporting meaningful engagement.

== Spectra of activities ==
Working on behalf of UNICEF, in 1992 sociologist Roger Hart created a model for thinking about youth participation as a continuum of activities. Entitled the "Ladder of Participation," this spectrum identifies eight types of youth participation ranging from tokenism and manipulation to engaging youth as partners. Adam Fletcher of the Freechild Project has identified a range of youth participation in social change through his "Cycle of Engagement". David Driskell, another UN-affiliated researcher, has identified several "steps" towards youth participation, while Daniel Ho-Sang has analyzed models according to a horizontal continuum.

== Indigenous American communities' way of learning ==
In some Indigenous communities of the Americas, children are seen as legitimate participants and have access to learn in order to make an important impact in their community. Their high involvement in family endeavors allow them to observe and experience skills they will need as community members. Children are able to learn because they have the chance to collaborate with everyone in the community. They also are eager to participate and take initiative to engage in family and community events

At different ages, children are performing a variety of tasks in their community. In the Yucatec Mayan community of Mexico, regardless of age, every member can be seen participating in the daily endeavors of their family in some form. At the age of 18 months, Mari is the youngest child in her family. Mari imitates her mother by using a leaf to scrub the stool like her mother. Mari’s mother pleasantly watcher her while she continues to clean the furniture. Although she is very young, her mother welcomes her eagerness to participate in the family’s daily endeavors.

Indigenous children of San Pedro engage in activities like play, lessons, work and free-standing conversation, with family and community members of different ages. Children from the age of two to three year olds are integrated in activities with their elders. For example, Many two to three year olds do errands around the community and sell fruit or other goods. This gives children greater accessibility to the endeavors of their elders and greater chances to learn useful skills.

Around three years old, Indigenous Mayan children from San Pedro, Guatemala are involved in mature-work such as farming, cooking, and caregiving. At this age they are observing what others are doing around them, but around five-years old they begin to directly help out such as running errands on their own. The Mayan children are able to learn by being highly involved in the adults’ work.

In the community of Chillihuani in the high Peruvian Andes, at an early age, children around the age of four years old contribute to their family by running errands and helping take care of younger siblings. Four year old Victor contributes to his family by running errands and helping take care of his two younger sisters by bringing his mother's diapers, going outside to dust small blankets, and holding their bottles while his sisters are drinking milk. This allows children to observe, listen and learn so that they can be able to meaningfully contribute to these endeavors as they get older.

As the children become older, they are able to take on more responsibilities. Also, as their skills become more advanced, children are able to take initiative in different tasks. In Guadalajara, Mexico, children around nine to ten-years old were reported regularly to take the initiative and contribute to family household works and activities like cleaning the house. This initiation allows children to be more involved in their community. For example, In Yucatan, Mexico, children as young as fifteen-year-old will take over his father’s field to cultivate which helps out their family immensely. Children take initiative out of interest and participate as much as they can.

In an experiment, siblings of Mexican-heritage with Indigenous history were invited to build a toy together. They were able to learn how to build the toy by working together, considering others ideas, and combining their methods. This study shows that being part of the community at an early age allows them to learn important values such as involvement and contribution which they carry out in their own activities.

In many Indigenous American communities, children are considered as legitimate contributing participants. Children are integrated in the daily endeavors of the family and community. They have greater access to various opportunities to observe and learn so that they can make a meaningful impact in their family and community.

== Participation of care leavers ==
Many young people who leave the care system are largely excluded in society. They are less likely to be in employment or higher education and at higher risk of trafficking, exploitation and suicide. In recent years, many organisations of care leavers have become established across the world. Some aim to support each other; others to ensure they can participate more in the decisions made about them. They are particularly vocal in global efforts at transforming systems of care or deinstitutionalisation.

== See also ==
- Convention on the Rights of the Child, particularly Articles 5 and 12
- Community youth development
- One World Youth Project
- Youth empowerment
- youth movements
- Youth voice
- National Commission on Resources for Youth
- UNICEF/Commonwealth Youth Programme, both of which are focused on youth participation
- Youth rights
- History of youth work
- List of youth organizations

== External links and further reading ==
- The Podium: A Collegiate Journal, where tomorrow's leaders speak today
- The Wellspring, a web log about youth leadership opportunities in Australia and at the United Nations (UN).
- SpunOut.ie Irish National Youth Website
- toolkits (series of four, 2006)
- International Youth Leadership Network
- Principles of youth participation
