= Youth rights =

Equal rights movement

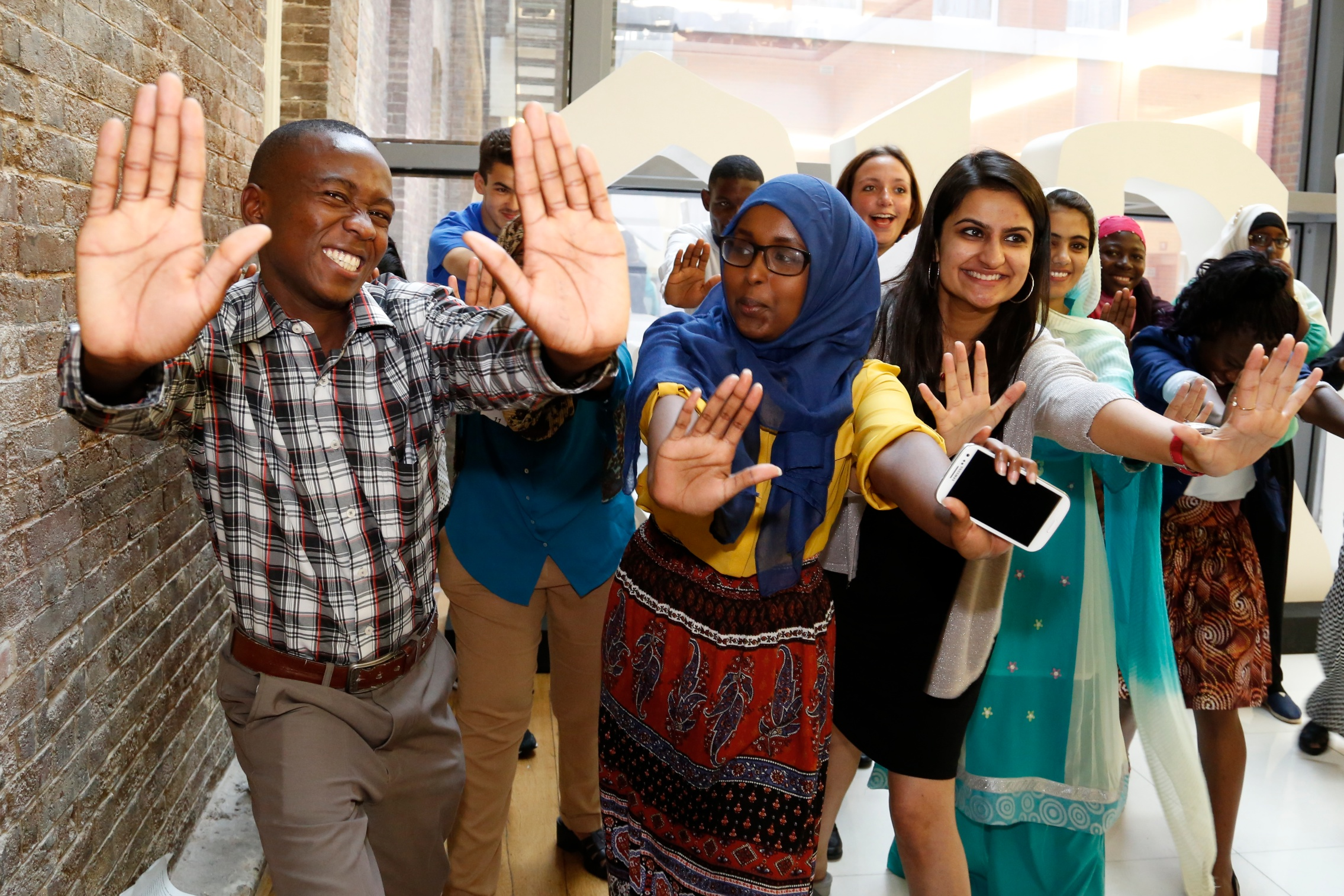
Youth For Change (London, UK) panel members push down metaphorical barriers.

The youth rights movement (also known as youth liberation) seeks to grant the rights to young people that are traditionally reserved for adults. This is closely akin to the notion of evolving capacities within the children's rights movement, but the youth rights movement differs from the children's rights movement in that the latter places emphasis on the welfare and protection of children through the actions and decisions of adults, while the youth rights movement seeks to grant youth the liberty to make their own decisions autonomously in the ways adults are permitted to, or to abolish the legal minimum ages at which such rights are acquired, such as the age of majority and the voting age.

Codified youth rights constitute one aspect of how youth are treated in society. Other aspects include social questions of how adults see and treat youth, and how open a society is to youth participation.

== Issues ==
Of primary importance to advocates of youth rights are historical perceptions of young people, considered to be oppressive and informed by paternalism, adultism and ageism in general, as well as fears of children and youth. Several of these perceptions include the assumption that young people are incapable of making crucial decisions and need protecting from their tendency to act impulsively or irrationally.

Such perceptions can inform laws throughout society, including voting age, child labor laws, the right to work, curfews, drinking age, smoking age, gambling age, age of consent, driving age, voting age, emancipation, medical autonomy, closed adoption, corporal punishment, the age of majority, and military conscription. Restrictions on young people that aren't applied to adults may be called status offenses and viewed as a form of unjustified discrimination.

There are specific sets of issues addressing the rights of youth in schools, including zero tolerance, "gulag schools", In loco parentis, and student rights in general. Homeschooling, unschooling, and alternative schools are popular youth rights issues. A long-standing effort within the youth rights movements has focused on civic engagement. Other issues include mandatory allowance and non-authoritarian parenting. There have been a number of historical campaigns to increase youth voting rights by lowering the voting age and the age of candidacy. There are also efforts to get young people elected to prominent positions in local communities, including as members of city councils and as mayors. For example, in the 2011 Raleigh mayoral election 17-year-old Seth Keel launched a campaign for Mayor despite the age requirement of 21. Strategies for gaining youth rights that are frequently utilized by their advocates include developing youth programs and organizations that promote youth activism, youth participation, youth empowerment, youth voice, youth/adult partnerships, intergenerational equity and civil disobedience between young people and adults.

== History ==
First emerging as a distinct movement in the 1930s, youth rights have long been concerned with civil rights and intergenerational equity. Tracing its roots to youth activists during the Great Depression, youth rights has influenced the civil rights movement, opposition to the Vietnam War, and many other movements. Since the advent of the Internet, the youth rights movement has been recaptured public interest, especially with Gen Z.

== Fallibility and individual differences ==
Some youth rights advocates use the argument of fallibility against the belief that others can know what is best or worst for an individual, and criticize the children's rights movement for assuming that exterior legislators, parents, authorities and so on can know what is for a minor's own good. These thinkers argue that the ability to correct what others think about one's own welfare in a falsificationist (as opposed to postmodernist) manner constitutes a non-arbitrary mental threshold at which an individual can speak for his or herself independently of exterior assumptions, as opposed to arbitrary chronological minimum ages in legislation. They also criticize the carte blanche for arbitrary definitions of "maturity" implicit in children's rights laws such as "with rising age and maturity" for being part of the problem, and suggest the absolute threshold of conceptual after-correcture to remedy it.

These views are often supported by people with experience of the belief in absolutely gradual mental development being abused as an argument for "necessity" of arbitrary distinctions such as age of majority which they perceive as oppressive (either currently oppressing or having formerly oppressed them, depending on age and jurisdiction), and instead cite types of connectionism that allows for critical phenomena that encompasses the entire brain. These thinkers tend to stress that different individuals reach the critical threshold at somewhat different ages with no more than one in 365 (one in 366 in the case of leap years) chance of coinciding with a birthday, and that the relevant difference that it is acceptable to base different treatment on is only between individuals and not between jurisdictions. Generally, the importance of judging each individual by observable relevant behaviors and not by birth date is stressed by advocates of these views.

== Youth rights ==
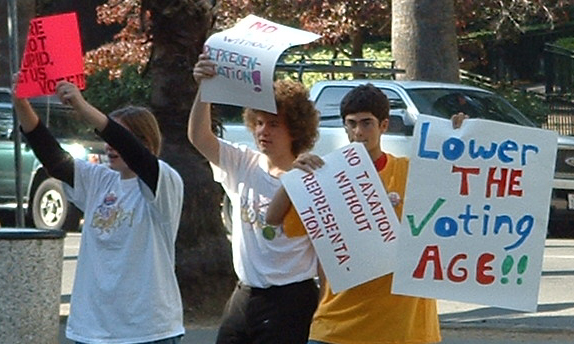
NYRA Berkeley voting age protest

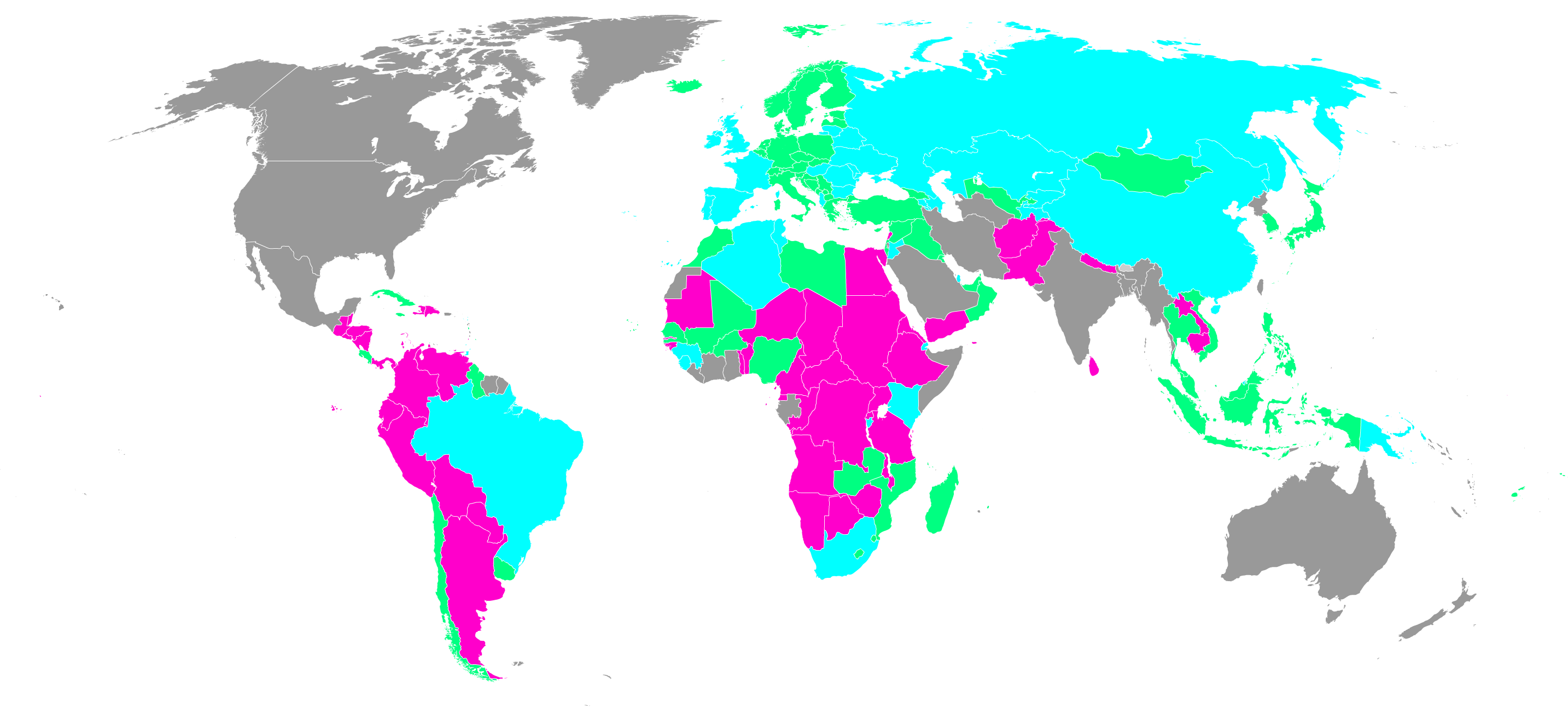
Minimum age convention 14 years: purple 15 years: green 16 years: blue

Children's rights cover all rights belonging to children. When individuals grow up, they are granted new rights (such as voting, consent, and driving) and duties (such as criminal responsibility and draft eligibility). There are different minimum limits of age at which youth are, situationally, not independent or deemed legally competent to make certain decisions or take certain actions. Some rights and responsibilities that legally come with age are:

- Voting age
- Age of candidacy
- Age of consent
- Age of majority
- Age of criminal responsibility
- Drinking age
- Driving age
- Legal working age
- Right to work
- Student rights
- Youth suffrage

After youth reach these limits they are free to vote, buy or consume alcohol beverages, and drive cars, among other acts.

== Movement ==
The "youth rights movement", also described as "youth liberation", is a nascent grass-roots movement whose aim is to fight against ageism and for the civil rights of young people – those "under the age of majority", which is 18 in most countries. Some groups combat pedophobia and ephebiphobia throughout society by promoting youth voice, youth empowerment and ultimately, intergenerational equity through youth/adult partnerships. Many advocates of youth rights distinguish their movement from the children's rights movement, which they argue advocates changes that are often restrictive towards children and youth.

=== Organizations in China ===
International Youth Rights (IYR) is a student-run youth rights organization in China, with regional chapters across the country and abroad. Its aim is to make voices of youth be heard across the world and give opportunities for youths to carry out their own creative solutions to world issues in real life.

=== Organizations in Europe ===
The European Youth Forum (YFJ, from Youth Forum Jeunesse) is the platform of the National Youth Council and International Non-Governmental Youth Organisations in Europe. It strives for youth rights in International Institutions such as the European Union, the Council of Europe and the United Nations. The European Youth Forum works in the fields of youth policy and youth work development. It focuses its work on European youth policy matters, whilst through engagement on the global level it is enhancing the capacities of its members and promoting global interdependence. In its daily work the European Youth Forum represents the views and opinions of youth organisations in all relevant policy areas and promotes the cross-sectoral nature of youth policy towards a variety of institutional actors. The principles of equality and sustainable development are mainstreamed in the work of the European Youth Forum. Other International youth rights organizations include Article 12 in Scotland and K.R.A.T.Z.A. in Germany.

In Malta, the voting age has been lowered to 16 in 2018 to vote in national and European Parliament elections.

The European Youth Portal is the starting place for the European Union's youth policy, with Erasmus+ as one of its key initiatives.

=== Organizations in the United States ===
The National Youth Rights Association is the primary youth rights organization for the youths in the United States, with local chapters across the country. The organization known as Americans for a Society Free from Age Restrictions is also an important organization. The Freechild Project has gained a reputation for interjecting youth rights issues into organizations historically focused on youth development and youth service through their consulting and training activities. The Global Youth Action Network engages young people around the world in advocating for youth rights, and Peacefire provides technology-specific support for youth rights activists.

Choose Responsibility and their successor organization, the Amethyst Initiative, founded by John McCardell, Jr., exist to promote the discussion of the drinking age, specifically. Choose Responsibility focuses on promoting a legal drinking age of 18, but includes provisions such as education and licensing. The Amethyst Initiative, a collaboration of college presidents and other educators, focuses on discussion and examination of the drinking age, with specific attention paid to the culture of alcohol as it exists on college campuses and the negative impact of the drinking age on alcohol education and responsible drinking.

=== Organizations in India ===
Young India Foundation (YIF) is a youth-led youth rights organization in India, based in Gurgaon with regional chapters across India. Its aim is to make voices of youth be heard across India and seek representation for the 60% of India's demographic that is below the age of 25. YIF is also the organization behind the age of candidacy campaign to bring down the age when a Member of Legislative Assembly or Member of Parliament can contest.

=== Prominent individuals ===
Youth rights, as a philosophy and as a movement, has been informed and is led by a variety of individuals and institutions across the United States and around the world. In the 1960s and 70s John Holt, Richard Farson, Paul Goodman and Neil Postman were regarded authors who spoke out about youth rights throughout society, including education, government, social services and popular citizenship. Shulamith Firestone also wrote about youth rights issues in the second-wave feminist classic The Dialectic of Sex. Alex Koroknay-Palicz has become a vocal youth rights proponent, making regular appearances on television and in newspapers. Mike A. Males is a prominent sociologist and researcher who has published several books regarding the rights of young people across the United States. Robert Epstein is another prominent author who has called for greater rights and responsibilities for youth. Several organizational leaders, including Sarah Fitz-Claridge of Taking Children Seriously, Bennett Haselton of Peacefire and Adam Fletcher of The Freechild Project conduct local, national, and international outreach for youth and adults regarding youth rights. Giuseppe Porcaro during his mandate as Secretary General of the European Youth Forum edited the second edition of the volume "The International Law of Youth Rights" published by Brill Publishers.

== See also ==
- Amethyst Initiative
- Choose Responsibility
- Community Alliance for the Ethical Treatment of Youth
- Defense of infancy
- Education reform
- Freechild Institute for Youth Engagement
- History of youth work
- List of articles related to youth rights
- List of youth organizations
- Mature minor doctrine
- National Youth Rights Association
- Infantilization
- Sudbury school
- Youth
- Youth participation
- Youth politics
- Youth voting rights
