= Community youth development =

Sociological practice

Community youth development (CYD) is a philosophy emphasizing the symbiotic nature of youth development to community development by situating the two practices in a common framework. CYD combines the natural instincts of young people as they desire to create change in their environments by developing partnerships between youth-related organizations and community development agencies to create new opportunities for youth to serve their communities while developing their personal abilities.

== See also ==
- Oaktree
- Positive youth development
