= Taking Children Seriously =

Parenting movement and educational philosophy

Taking Children Seriously (TCS) is an exploration of parenting and educational philosophy whose central idea is that children are full people.

== Overview ==
TCS was conceived between 1988 and 1989 by Sarah Fitz-Claridge, and later grew into an online mailing-list around 1992.

TCS begins with the observation that most traditional interactions between adults and youth are based on coercion. Instead of viewing some sources of ideas – such as parents’ ideas – as having authority, Taking Children Seriously takes the growth of knowledge seriously, which means free competition of the ideas irrespective of source.

The TCS model of parenting and education views coercion as infringing on the will of the child, and also rejects parental or educator "self-sacrifice" as infringing on the will of the adult. TCS defines coercion as: "double-binding – putting others in no-win situations – using your ingenuity to actively prevent problems being solved. Authority. Interacting hierarchically. Looking down on." TCS advocates that parents and children act creatively to find solutions without force or compromise.

The TCS philosophy is informed by the epistemology of Karl Popper and David Deutsch, a theoretical physicist at Oxford University.
