= National Youth Rights Association =

United States youth rights organization

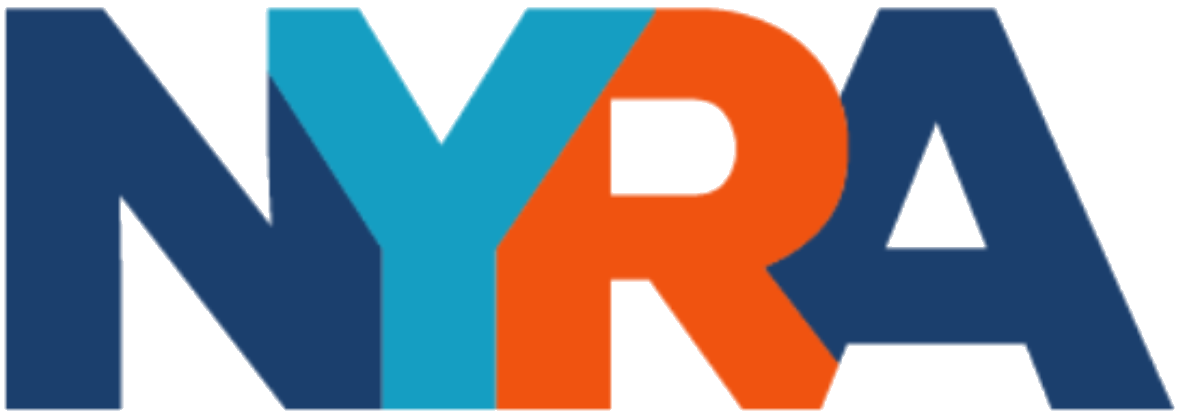
- Formation: 1998
- Headquarters: Takoma Park, Maryland, U.S.
- President: Zane Miller
- Vice President: Rimon-Hadassah Walker
- Website: youthrights.org

The National Youth Rights Association (NYRA) is an American youth-led civil and political rights organization promoting youth rights, with approximately 10,000 members. NYRA promotes the lessening or removing of various legal restrictions that are imposed on young people but not on adults, for example, the drinking age, voting age, and the imposition of youth curfew laws.

== Youth rights movement ==
The youth rights movement first utilized the Internet in 1991, with the creation of the Y-Rights listserv mailing list. Two members of that original Internet presence, Matthew Walcoff and Matt Herman, began a non-profit organization out of that mailing list known as ASFAR. Not too long after ASFAR was founded, a Rockville, Maryland high school student began a youth rights group called YouthSpeak. At the same time, the third youth from Canada, Joshua Gilbert, was starting a youth rights organization for his country, the Canadian Youth Rights Association (CYRA). Walcoff, Herman, Hein, and Gilbert all met through ASFAR, and decided to start a non-profit corporation to help unify the youth rights movement, which at that point consisted of almost a dozen different groups around North America and the world.

== Forming NYRA ==
NYRA's Executive Director from 2000 to 2012 was Alex Koroknay-Palicz. As its key spokesman, he was featured on CNN, Fox News, PBS, The New York Times, Los Angeles Times, The Christian Science Monitor, as well as many others, on youth rights issues such as the voting and drinking ages. In 2012, Koroknay-Palicz stepped down before reemerging in 2015.

2005 was a significant year for NYRA. In late March, Koroknay-Palicz and several NYRA members traveled to Vermont in support of a bill lowering the drinking age to 18. They visited numerous colleges and signed up over 2000 new supporters. They participated in a debate at the Vermont state house, and the event was significantly covered by the media. Meanwhile, in Washington state, a new chapter in Olympia, Washington, testified in support of a state constitutional amendment to lower the state's voting age to sixteen. From February to August 2006, President Adam King led a local campaign to add a nonvoting student adviser onto the Buncombe County (N.C.) Board of Education. His project had the support of the Asheville Citizen-Times and over 60 faculty members and administrators at his high school. However, in August, the Board of Education rejected his proposal citing that they already had sufficient student input. During his campaign, King made several appearances in the media.

By 2006, NYRA's main area of focus was expanding its local chapters. Chapters had increased fivefold between 2003 and 2006. In 2006, the Board of Directors formally established that chapters are separate legal entities. The chapter formation division saw a major restructure near the end of 2006. Previously, the division was divided into five regions with one person assigned to that region. However, the division's management decided to utilize a national pool of representatives working with all intents throughout the nation. In December 2006, NYRA received its first substantial grant from the Babson Foundation. And in January 2007, it began renting an office from Common Cause in downtown Washington, D.C.

In 2008, the organizations changed its slogan from "the last civil rights movement", in reference to the youth rights movement, to "live free, start young."

In 2009, NYRA began to take prominent legal action and assert itself as a force for youth and students in jurisprudence. The organization filed its first joint amicus curiae brief in Safford v. Redding, a student rights case brought before the United States Supreme Court, its President published an opinion opposing the Barr et al. v. Lafon case in the award-winning University of Pittsburgh School of Law journal "the Jurist", and a local chapter filed a lawsuit against the city of West Palm Beach, Florida, in an effort to repeal its curfew, a case which is still ongoing.

NYRA co-sponsored the First Annual National Youth Rights Day which occurred on April 14, 2010. Robert Epstein wrote "The Young Person's Bill of Rights" for this event.

== Governance ==
NYRA is a 501(c)(3) organization registered as a nonprofit corporation in Maryland.

It is governed by Zane Miller, President & Rimon-Hadassah Walker, Vice-President of NYRA.

== See also ==
- Timeline of young peoples' rights in the United States
- Youth suffrage
