= Youth-adult partnership =

Intergenerational collaboration between young people and adults

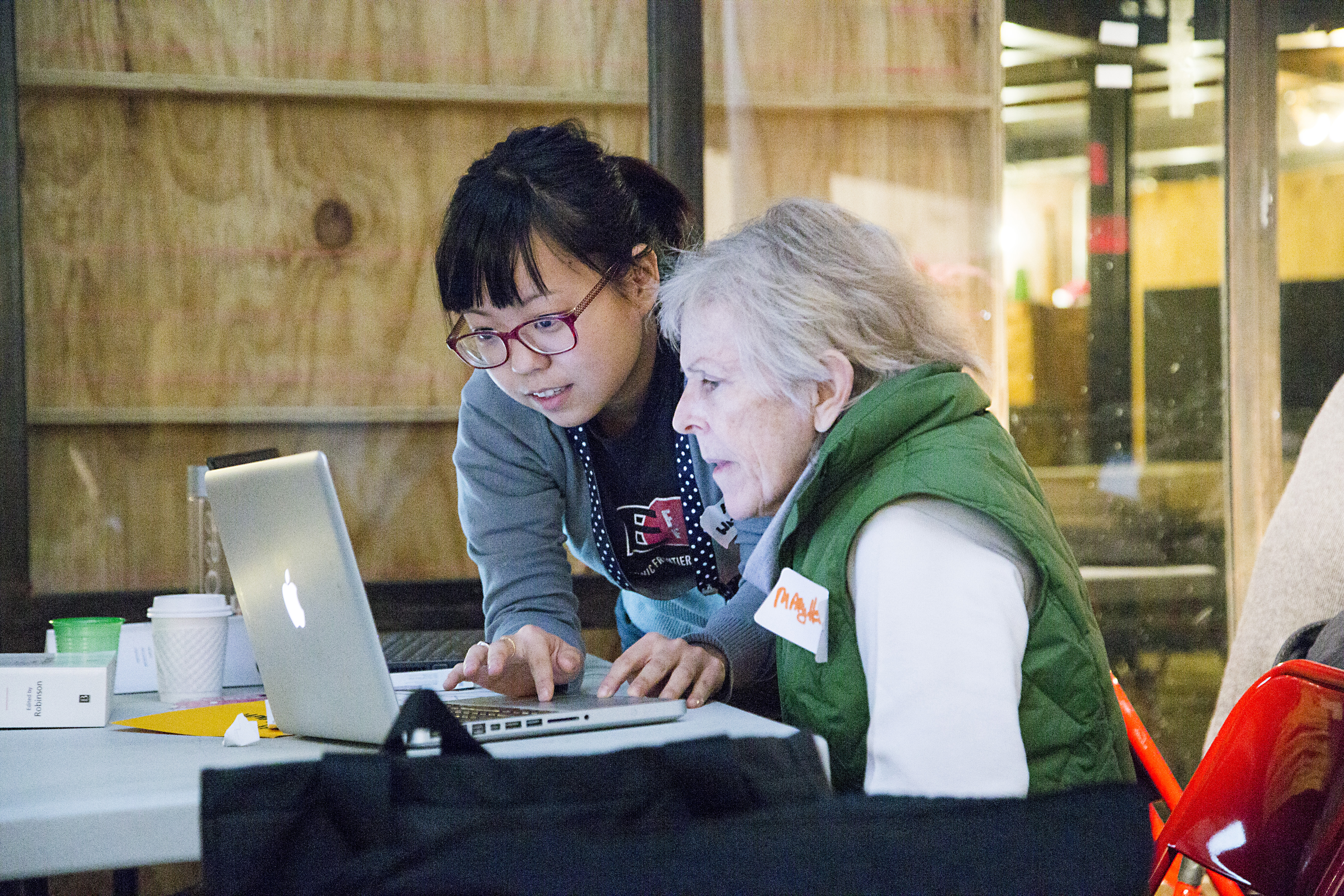
intergenerational support at Wikipedia Art+Feminism Edit-a-thon

Youth-adult partnership is a conscious relationship that establishes and sustains intergenerational equity between young people and adults. Youth-adult partnerships often display a high degree of youth rights and autonomy, and is often synonymous with meaningful youth participation. Typically seen with adults acting in a mentor capacity, providing scaffolding to the youth. Unlike traditional mentoring, youth-adult partnerships are categorized by multiple adults and multiple youth and there must also be a mutuality where adults and youth teach and learn from one another, working together in their community.

== Factors for success ==
The success of these partnerships rely on a variety of factors. In addition to concrete outcomes, youth/adult partnerships require specific cultural and structural supports within organizations and communities in order to succeed.

There needs to be mutual respect and cohesiveness within members of the partnership.

== Common settings ==
These relationships usually occur within youth organizations, where they are typified by youth voice. Youth voice is commonly recognized as an essential element of effective youth-adult partnerships.

=== Schools ===
In democratic schools, they are typified by student voice. One of the expectations from these youth-adult partnerships is that the student-led groups can represent the student body to the administration and school boards. This can be done in a variety of different ways, such as planning activities, cocreating curriculum, and assessing progress and current effectiveness of programs within the school.

==== Communities ====
Youth-adult partnerships can empower youth and adults as they educate their peers and advocate for the promotion of health and active engagement in the community.

== Outcomes ==
Youth-adult partnerships allow young people to:

- Express their views and raise awareness for social issues publicly
- Gain respect for adult allies
- Find ways to express their creativity
- Work for a good cause
- Think more critically
- Be a valued asset to the project and the community
- Raise issues that adults may be avoiding, or unaware of.

The relationships formed by youth-adult partnerships combat ephebiphobia and adultism by elevating the role of youth voice.

A broad number of parties benefit from said partnerships, including the organizations where the partnerships occur, and the adults and youth who are involved. Actual benefits range from increased commitment, to higher feelings of self-efficacy, as well as increased organizational effectiveness and civic engagement. Youth-adult partnerships have been found to be particularly effective in addressing school improvement, promoting global health initiatives, and integrating technology in the classroom.

According to the State of Texas, youth-adult partnerships have allowed young people to assume the roles of advisors and consultants to youth organizations, political lobbyists, community organizers, grant decision-makers, nonprofit board directors, and as direct youth service providers. Additional practice has identified significant roles for youth-adult partnerships in rural civic engagement projects and in creating effective outreach for lesbian, gay, bisexual, transgender, queer, and questioning youth.

== See also ==
- Community youth development
- Intergenerational equity
- Positive psychology
- Service learning
- Youth participation
