= Association for Experiential Education =

Nonprofit professional membership association

The Association for Experiential Education (AEE) is a nonprofit, professional membership association that promotes experiential education. Currently based in St. Petersburg, Florida, USA, it was founded in the early 1970s in Boone, North Carolina by a group of educators who believed that the core of learning is enhanced by experiential forms of education.

== Membership ==
AEE members have affiliations in education, recreation, outdoor and adventure programming, the environment, mental health, youth development, programming for people with disabilities, service learning, and organizational development. Professionals, organizations, and students who share the mission and vision of AEE join to benefit from and contribute to the network of resources championing experiential education. This includes the publication of an academic journal, as well as regional and international conferences.

== Publications ==
The AEE hosts a clearinghouse of information about experiential education and publishes the Journal of Experiential Education, in collaboration with SAGE Publications since 2013.

== Conferences ==
The AEE has hosted an annual international conference since 1972. In addition, it conducts eight regional conferences which jointly serve more than 1,800 attendees with hundreds of workshops, prominent speakers, continuing education units, networking opportunities, and entertainment. The AEE also has a Therapeutic Adventure Professional Group which offers webinars, pre-conference events, and bestows an annual award.

Educators, practitioners and students from around the world come together at these events with the goal of developing professionally, and promoting, defining, and applying the theories and practices of experiential education.

== Accreditation ==
After a rapid increase in the number of adventure programs in the late 1980s and early 1990s, the need for standards of program quality, professional behavior, and appropriate risk management became imperative. In 1994, the AEE responded to that need by developing the most comprehensive standards for common practices in the adventure education industry, becoming the nation's first recognized accreditation process focusing on adventure education programming. Since then, the AEE Accreditation Program's standards-based evaluation process by objective, independent reviewers has become the industry-accepted level of professional evaluation for adventure programs. The AEE recently added an accreditation program focusing on Outdoor Behavioral Healthcare.

== Awards ==
Among other awards, AEE has presented the Karl Rohnke Creativity Award since 1997.

=== Past recipients ===
- 1997 – Sandy Carlson
- 1998 – Mobile Team Challenge
- 1999 – Jim Cain
- 2000 – Sam Sikes
- 2001 – Rufus Collinson
- 2003 – Thomas A. Shearer
- 2005 – Tom Smith
- 2006 – Clifford Knapp
- 2007 – TA Loeffler
- 2008 – Chris Cavert
- 2009 – Brent Bell
- 2010 – Kim Wasserburger
- 2011 – Maurie Lung
- 2012 – Marilyn Levin
- 2014 – Madhu Sudan
- 2015 – Gary Stauffer
- 2016 – Amy Climer
- 2017 – Michelle Cummings
- 2018 – Jude Hirsch
- 2019 – Seth C. Hawkins

[No award given in 2002, 2004, and 2013]

== See also ==
- Adventure education
- Adventure therapy
- Experiential education
- Outdoor education
