= Adventure therapy =

Type of psychotherapy

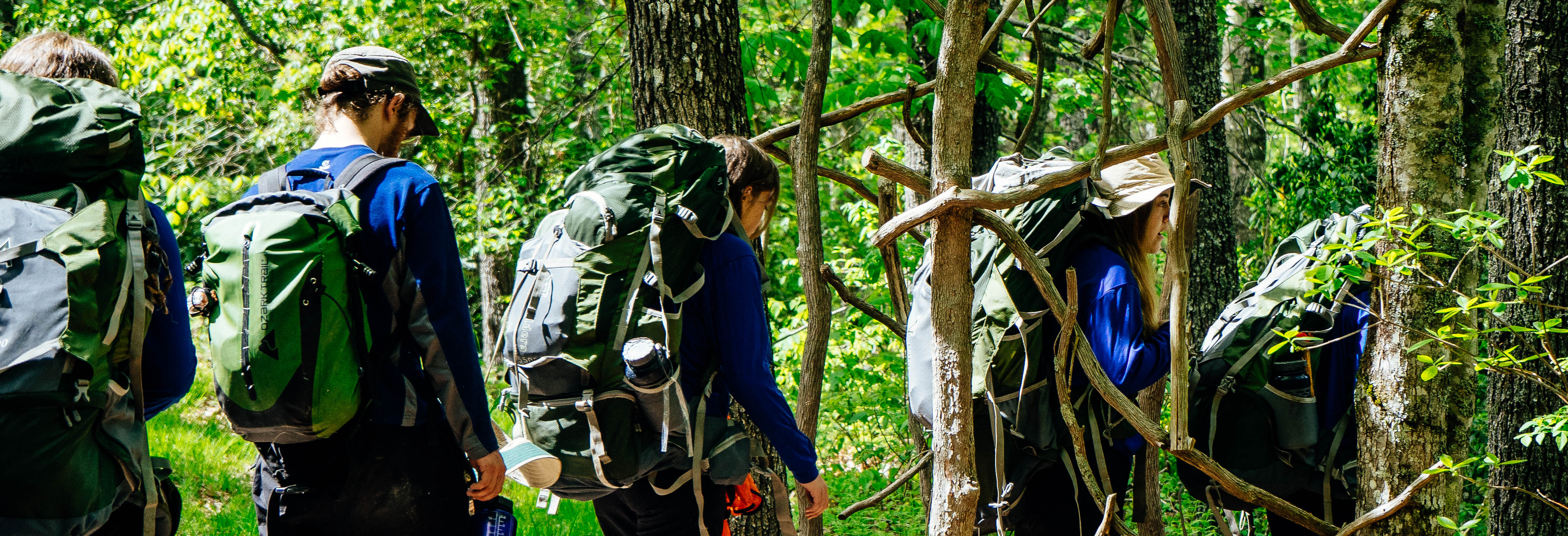
Backpacking as part of wilderness therapy

Adventure therapy is a form of psychotherapy created as early as the 1960s. It is influenced by a variety of learning and psychological theories. Experiential education is the underlying philosophy.

Existing research in adventure therapy reports positive outcomes in improving self-concept and self-esteem, help-seeking behavior, increased mutual aid, pro-social behavior, trust behavior, and more. There is some disagreement about the underlying process that creates these positive outcomes.

== Definition ==
Many different terms have been used to identify the diverse methods of treatment in the wilderness environment. Adventure therapy and wilderness therapy are variations of outdoor experiential therapy. Outdoor experiential therapy utilizes the outdoors as a treatment modality to promote "rehabilitation, growth, development, and enhancement of an individual's physical, social, and psychological well-being through the application of structured activities involving direct experience". The latter may be part of a residential treatment program.

According to Ewert, McCormick, and Voight, adventure therapy uses outdoor activities that involve some elements of adventure (such as perceived risk, actual risk, or uncertainty), and outdoor experiential therapy programs are "wilderness therapy" if they take place in any outdoor setting (although usually, programs using this term take place in "wilderness-type" settings). Some use the term "adventure therapy" as an umbrella for a wide array of related approaches, including wilderness therapy.

More recently, adventure therapy has evolved to include the use of adventure activities supported by traditional therapy. Often, adventure therapy is conducted in groups or families, although it is increasingly being used for individuals. Adventure therapy approaches psychological treatment through experience and action within cooperative games, trust activities, problem-solving initiatives, high adventure, outdoor pursuits, and wilderness expeditions.

Positive behavior changes, which are synonymous with psychological healing, can occur through a variety of processes. For example, through the use of vicarious experience, verbal persuasion, and overwhelming mastery experiences, participants' efficacy in the adventure activity may be increased. These increases may then be generalized to treatment outcomes within and across life domains. Five factors can be used to promote generalization of efficacy across domains: overwhelming mastery experiences, identification of similar sub-skills, co-development of sub-skills, cognitive restructuring of efficacy beliefs, and generalizing sub-skills. Debriefing or processing provides a context for implementing therapeutic techniques related to the desired outcomes. It typically involves facilitators leading a discussion to help participants internalize the experience and relate it to therapeutic goals.

== History ==
Adventure as a method of healing can be traced back to many cultures including Native American, Jewish, and Christian traditions.

Emerging in the early 1900s, tent therapy brought certain patients out of psychiatric hospitals and into tents on their lawns. A series of studies were carried out as many patients showed signs of improvement, although they failed to show efficacy due to a lack of evidence. Study and practice of this early version of adventure therapy lasted approximately twenty years and then seemed to have dropped off completely.

In the mid-1900s, this approach reappeared mainly as camping programs designed for troubled youth. The era influenced the present-day use and extent of adventure therapy programs with adolescents. The format for these programs utilized observation, diagnosis, and psychotherapy. One of the first of these programs was Salesmanship Club Camp, based in Dallas, Texas, founded by Campbell Loughmiller in 1946. His philosophy of adventure in therapy included the theory that the "...perception of danger and immediate natural consequences for [a] lack of cooperation on the part of [participants]...[after confronting danger] built self-esteem, [while] suffering natural consequences taught the real need for cooperation." His ideas informed some adventure therapy programs.

This period also saw the creation of Outward Bound in the 1940s by Kurt Hahn. Outward Bound was a direct response by Lawrence Holt, part-owner of the Blue Funnel Shipping Company, who was looking for a training program for young sailors. These sailors seemed to have lost the tenacity and fortitude needed to survive the rigors of war and shipwreck, unlike older sailors, who were more likely to survive because of their formative experiences on ships. In this way, Outward Bound was engaging in a form of adventure therapy – intervening in the lack of tenacity through the use of challenging adventure training.

In the 1960s, Outward Bound came to the United States through the Colorado Outbound School. The Colorado Outbound School uses Kurt Han's survival training program, which focuses on the idea that training through challenges produces better results than training for challenges. Josh Miner adopted Han's philosophy and became the founder of this program, the Colorado Outbound School Program. Since 1962, the Colorado Outbound School Program has been providing outdoor experiential learning for over a million students, through all walks of life.

Other schools quickly began to use Outward Bound as an adjunctive experience working with adjudicated youth and adults (one of the first programs in 1964 offered recently released prisoners a job at Coors Brewery if they completed a 23-day course). In the late 1970s, Colorado Outward Bound developed the Mental Health Project. Courses were offered to adults dealing with substance abuse, mental illness, surviving a sexual assault, and others. In 1980, Stephen Bacon wrote the seminal adventure therapy The Conscious Use of Metaphor in Outward Bound, which linked the work of Milton Erickson and Carl Jung to the Outward Bound process.

Project Adventure adapted the Outward Bound philosophy for school environments and used ropes course activities developed at the Colorado Outward Bound School into use at schools. Project Adventure emerged in Hamilton-Wenham Regional High School in Massachusetts in 1972 with a principal named Jerry Pieh, son of Robert Pieh, founder of the Minnesota Outward Bound School.

Paul Radcliffe, a school psychologist, and Mary Smithy, a staff member, along with a social worker from Addison Gilbert Hospital, started a two-hour weekly outpatient group. This model was incorporated into school psychological services and was called the Learning Activities Group. It grew into Adventure-Based Counseling (ABC), a Project Adventure term that reflects the therapeutic use of adventure activities.

== Theory ==
Adventure therapy theory draws from a mixture of learning and psychological theories. The learning theories include contributions from Albert Bandura, John Dewey, Kurt Hahn, and Kurt Lewin. These theorists have also been credited with contributing to the main theories comprising experiential education. Experiential education is a theoretical component of adventure therapy. The ideas and thinking of Alfred Adler, Albert Ellis, Milton Erickson, William Glasser, Carl Jung, Abraham Maslow, Jean Piaget, Carl Rogers, B.F. Skinner, Fritz Perls, and Viktor Frankl all appear to have contributed to the thinking in adventure therapy and experiential movements for the progression of education. Adventure therapy is a cognitive-behavioral-affective approach that utilizes a humanistic existential base to strategically enact change via direct multi-sensory experiences.

Most research on adventure therapy as a therapeutic intervention has focused on aspects of cooperation and trust, while other research examines therapeutic techniques with adventure therapy or outcomes on pathology. There remains a lack of follow-up data into the standards, requirements, education and training of individuals conducting adventure therapy. In a 1994 meta-analysis aimed at statistically integrating all the available empirical research on adventure therapy, 43 studies in a 25-year span were found to fit the criteria for analysis.

The major theme of these questions about adventure therapy is effectiveness, as outcome-driven research has generated conflicting findings.

Several researchers have attempted to explain the underlying process influencing outcomes of adventure therapy. A comprehensive 2013 meta-analysis by Bowen and Neill, which reviewed 197 studies with over 17,000 participants, found a moderate short-term effect size (g = 0.47), with the strongest outcomes for clinical and self-concept measures. The study found that the effectiveness of adventure therapy was influenced by participant age and program structure, and that these positive effects were sustained over the long term, though further research is needed to fully understand the mechanisms behind these outcomes.

Adventure therapy is described as nontraditional therapy allowing for the pre-therapeutic adolescent to experience their mental health issues, with several theoretical aspects:

1. It is a physical augmentation to traditional therapy for the purpose of a shared history with the participants and the therapist
2. There is a sense of natural and logical consequences in the activities
3. Social environment should be structured into the activities
4. A participant perceives risk, stress, and anxiety so that they can problem-solve and generate their own sense of community for feedback and behavior modeling
5. Participants will transfer their present attitudes and behaviors into the activities
6. Works with a small group of participants
7. Requires a facilitator that models appropriate behaviors and guides the group towards adaptive self-regulation that is based upon appropriate behaviors.

Adventure therapy has normalizing effects on deficits in delinquent adolescent developmental processes, as a way of moving into formal operational thinking, which is achieved through the experiential learning theories. The theoretical basis of adventure therapy describes the participant as a learning being who achieves their greatest learning outside the classroom, through challenge and perceived risk, promoting social skills through experiencing a group challenge mixed with affect, cognition, psychomotor activity, and formal operational thinking generated through metaphor. Experiential learning becomes adventure therapy when the activities are planned and implemented as vehicles for patients to address individual treatment goals. Adventure experiences molded into a more therapeutic group model run by the therapist can have a more significant effect than the one-day intervention run by counselors.

Baldwin et al., though, report that many of these explanations are "...folk pedagogies..." that lack thorough empirical evidence. Adventure therapy research has focused on outcomes without exploring theoretical structure. Some argue that the focus of adventure therapy research needs should be on testing and validating theoretical structure, and that discussion of outcomes should only come after a theoretical structure has been validated.

== Effectiveness ==
The effectiveness of adventure therapy has been the subject of numerous studies. Research suggests that adventure therapy can be an effective treatment option for a range of mental health issues, including depression, anxiety, and substance abuse disorders. Some research has also shown that adventure therapy can have a lasting impact on an individual's self-concept.

A meta-analysis of 26 studies of psychological intervention programs for youth at risk which used a version of the Youth Outcomes Questionnaire found very large positive effect sizes for wilderness-based programs according to observers (g = 1.38), which was larger than the changes according to observers for non-wilderness programs (g = 0.74). Participant self-report results showed large effects for wilderness-based programs (g = 0.72) and larger effects for non-wilderness programs (g = 0.89).

Outdoor delinquency programs have a reduced recidivism rate compared to traditional indoor therapeutic programs. Adventure therapy is further viewed as effective because of the apparent positive effects in treating developmental issues with juvenile offenders and adolescent offenders with drug abuse and addiction issues. The effectiveness of adventure therapy on offenders with drug abuse and addiction issues in mental health treatment is related to the characteristics present in addicted offenders. They "...(1) need more structure, [and] (2) they work better with an informal, tactile-kinesthetic design..." Adventure therapy as treatment is equally effective for adjudicated youth and other adolescent populations.

A 1994 meta-analysis found that 62% of adolescents who participated in an adventure therapy group were at an advantage for coping with adolescent issues than those who did not. There is a 12% improvement in self-concept for adolescents who participate in adventure therapy. Adolescents are approximately 30% better off in their ability to cope with mental health issues than those who do not participate in a psychotherapeutic treatment, leading to the implication that adventure therapy effectiveness is comparable to the effectiveness of psychotherapeutic treatment.

Adventure therapy has many challenges and things that could limit its effectiveness. These include: "availability of studies, heterogeneity, generalizability, type of data provided by empirical studies, and the methodological quality of studies". Additionally, though self-efficacy, self-esteem, and locus of control are often cited as primary topics of focus of adventure therapy, there is little research that verifies its effectiveness in any of those areas. Furthermore, due to the limited scope of research, there is little accountability to ensure that programs implement the most effective and current interventions, allowing for approaches that are dated at best and may constitute malpractice at worst.

== See also ==
- Adventure education
- Outdoor education
