= Ljubičevo Equestrian Games =

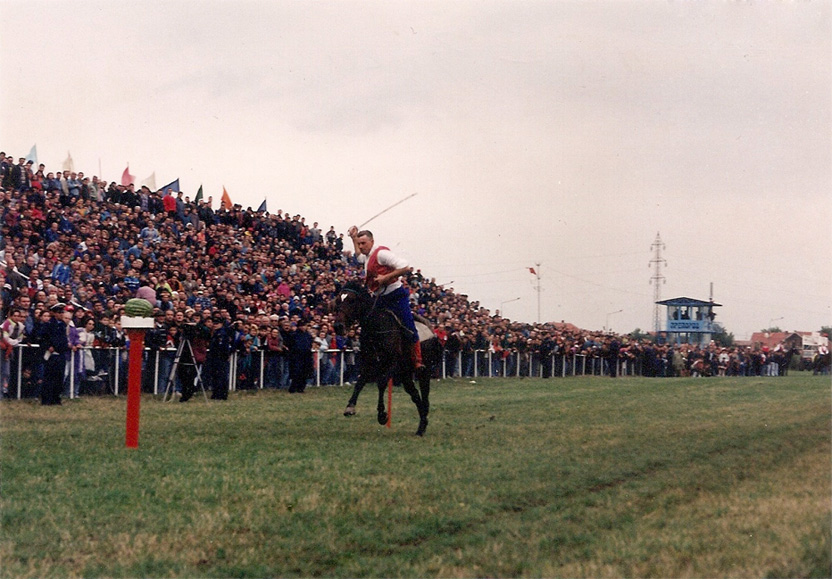
Nebojša Dozet, knight of the Ljubičevo Equestrian Games for 1996, 2000 and 2001

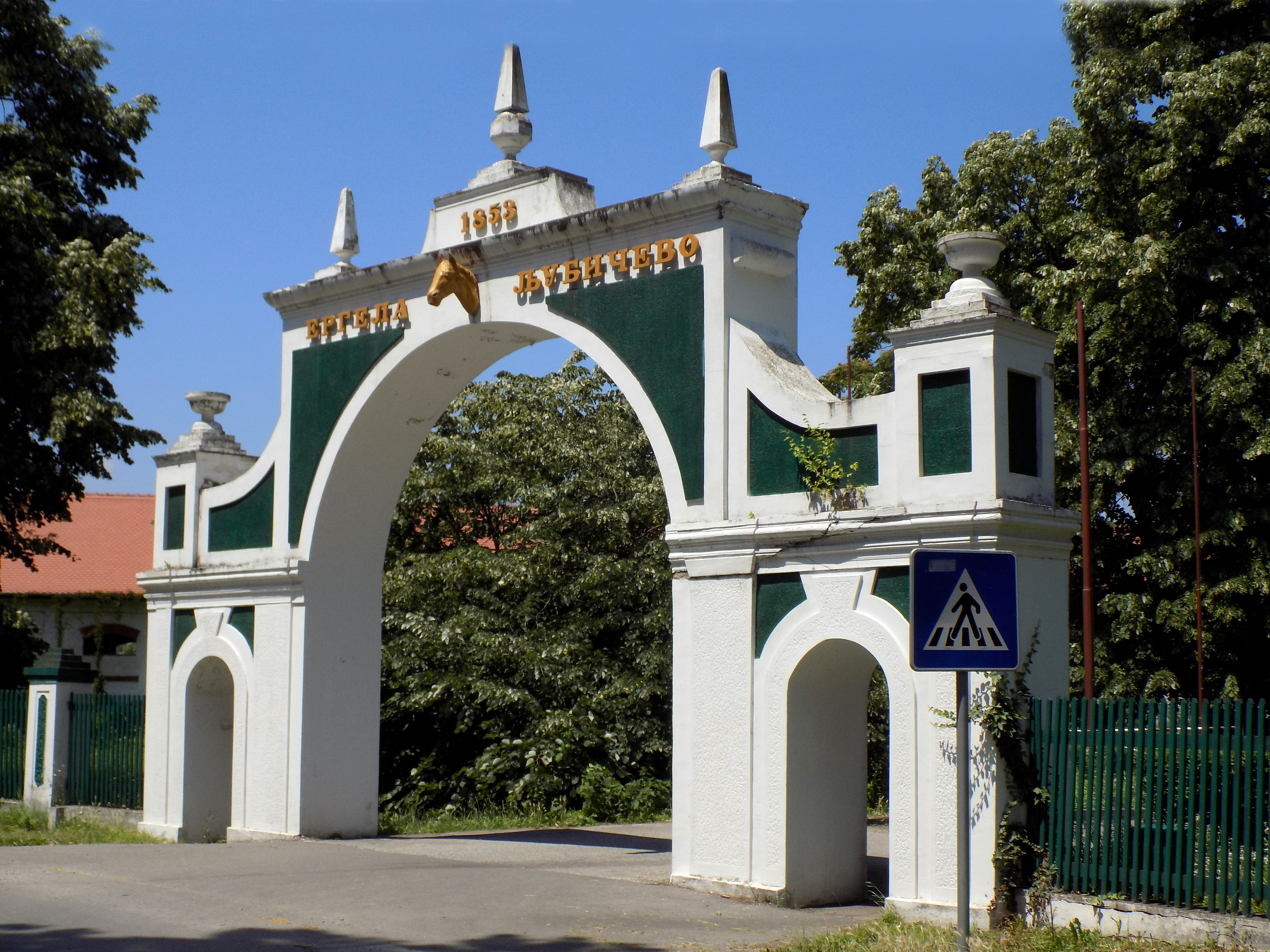
Ljubičevo stable - main gate

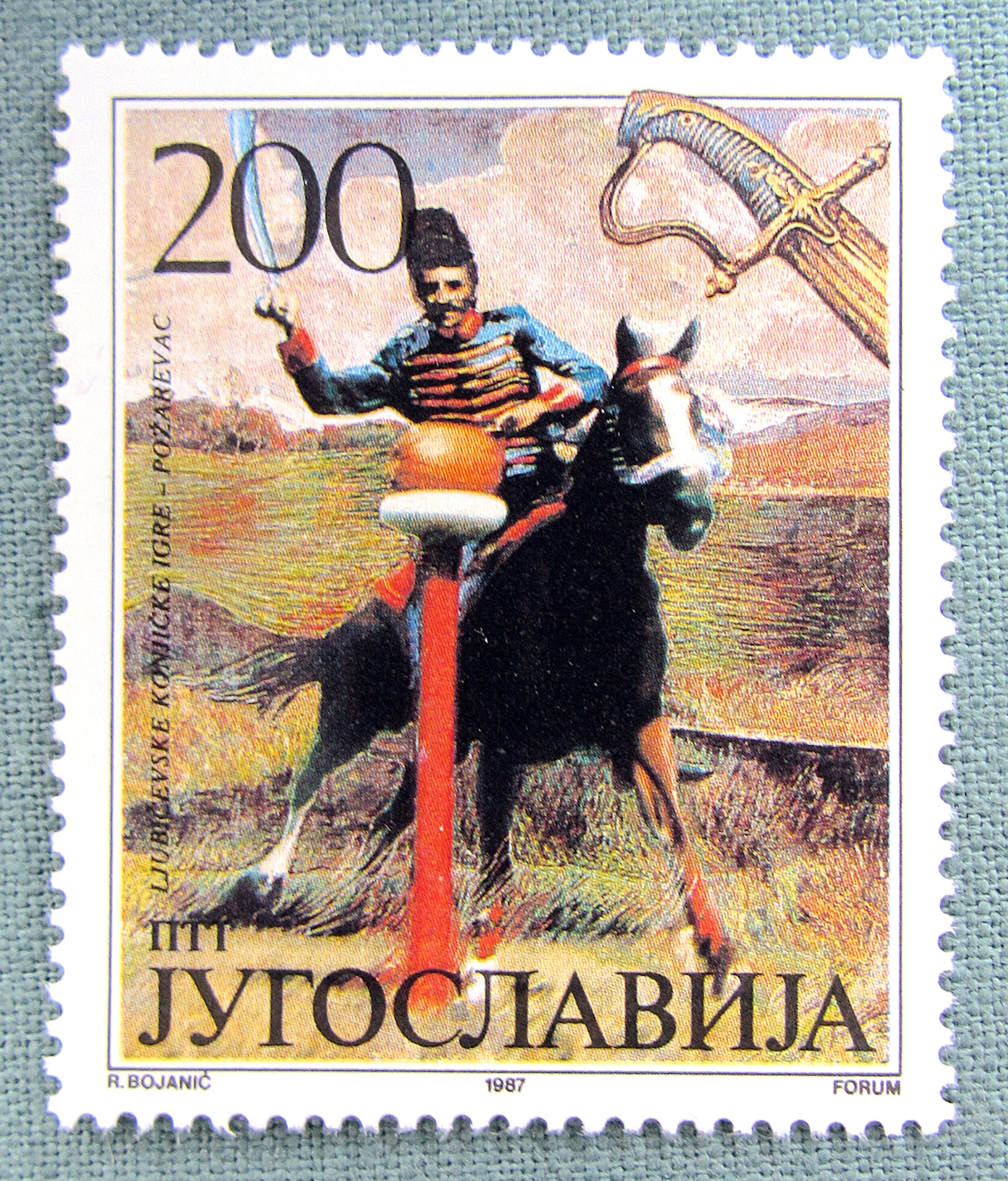
Ljubičevo Equestrian Games on a 1987 stamp of Yugoslavia

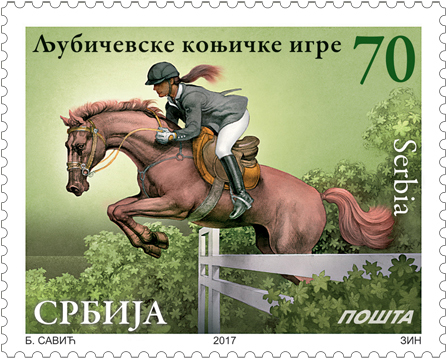
Ljubičevo Equestrian Games on a 2017 stamp of Serbia

Ljubičevo Equestrian Games (Serbian: Љубичевске коњичке игре / Ljubičevske konjičke igre) is an equestrian tournament held annually in Požarevac. In 2023, the tournament had its 60th birthday and was a central event in the whole region. The tournament is held during the first week of September.

== History ==
On the right shore of the river Velika Morava is located one of the oldest stables named Ljubičevo stable. In this place, before the stable was founded, there was a large agricultural property of Miloš Obrenović I, Prince of Serbia called "Morava". In April 1860, Miloš donated his property to the country. At the same time, Miloš ordered that the stable from a place called Ćuprija is moved to his property, that stable was established earlier by Aleksandar Karađordević. The only thing left in Ćuprija was the branch Dobričevo and by the fall of that year the big stable was built in Ljubičevo and the entire complex was moved there. During the governance of prince Mihajlo in 1866 when the headmaster was Aga Jefta, in the honor of princess Ljubica, wife of Miloš Obrenović I, Prince of Serbia, the agricultural property was named Ljubičevo.

== Dunavsko kolo ==
At the end of the 19th century, founding the Dunavsko kolo, riders club named "Knez Mihajlo" in Požarevac the horse racing tournaments begin. This kind of tournaments took place more than a few times in one year, especially during September. One of those tournaments took place on Sunday 4 September 1932 on the track "Mihailovac" at 3 p.m.

== Horse exhibit in Ljubičevo ==
Besides horse racing, the riders of Dunavsko kolo "Knez Mihajlo" from Požarevac also organized a horse exhibit. The horse exhibit was located in the area of the barracks of the Ninth Infantry regiment at nine o'clock in the morning. The exhibit was divided into 7 competitive classes depending on age and fertility. The main sponsor of the exhibit was the Ministry of Agriculture which donated to the riders of Dunavsko kolo an aid of 2000 dinars. The riders from its own resources acquire urale, zobnice and četke so that all the exhibit horses can get one of those items. During the exhibit they gave awards for each category, 1st place 300 dinars, 2nd place 200 dinars and 3rd 100 dinars. The panel of judges which evaluated horses consisted of the most competent people of Požarevac, who worked on the horse breeding plan. Members of the panel were: director of Public stable"Ljubičevo" Miloš Radosavljević, headmaster of agricultural school Jovan Dulić, veterinarian consultment Petar Savić and Živojin Perić from Pozarevac. Along with participation of over 100 horses from Požarevac and the whole country, couple of breed horses from Požarevac took the awards from all categories.

== Beginnings of equestrian tournaments ==
In the afternoon, the same day, the tournament was held on the race track "Mihailovac". Four separated races were held: race of dvogoda, fertile male and female, born in 1930 in the country. The length of the track was 1200m. Load for the male was 58 kg, for the female 56 kg, while the halfblooded wore 5 kg less. Second race was for male and female born in 1929 in the country. Length of the track was 1800 m. Third race was for all horses 3 years and older. Length of the track was 2400 m. Fourth race was for the chosen horses of the Public stable "Ljubicevo". Length of the track was 2800 m.

Awards for the first three places were 1st place 2100, 2nd place 1000 and 3rd place 600 dinars. While the stable "Ljubičevo" gave awards in gifts. Exhibit and horse racing attracted a large number of participants and viewers, and by the reports of that time, it was a total success because it raised interest in horse breeding. Then, as well as today, in the time of Equestrian tournament, there is also a rich cultural program organized for the visitors. On Sunday, 4 September, beside the exhibit and horse racing there was also a concert of the Ninth Infantry regiment in the City park at 11 o'clock in the morning and in the evening Public theatre of Požarevac had pa play "Šampion boksa" from the Shwarc and Mataran. Military music of the Ninth Infantry regiment under the regiment of Kapellmeister Dominisa Ivana in the City park, where they usually held concerts, every Sunday and holidays, with an entertainment program. The theatre usually held their plays in the new hall of mercantilist youth every Tuesday, Thursday, Saturday and Sunday. Those days two cinema "Šuhart" and "Kruna", with its repertoires, within daily and evening shows, showed various movies.

They also had scientific lectures in Public University which all together made a cultural scene of Požarevac in the 1830s.

== See also ==
- Ljubičevo All-Around
