= Project Adventure =

International nonprofit education organization

- Abbreviation: PA
- Formation: 1971
- Type: Youth organization
- Legal status: Non-profit organization
- Headquarters: Beverly, Massachusetts
- Location: United States
- Executive Director & CEO: Caitlin McCormick Small
- Website: www.pa.org

Project Adventure is an international nonprofit education organization based in Beverly, Massachusetts. The mission of Project Adventure is to provide leadership in the expansion of adventure-based experiential programming.

== Core activities ==
Project Adventure is a student engagement program used in schools across the United States of America and around the world. As "one of the first large-scale outdoor programs to organize as a non-profit and register youth for multi-day, educational outing programs", the organization is widely acknowledging as influencing several trends and methodologies throughout education.

== History ==
The organization known as Project Adventure began as an adventure-based physical education program at the Hamilton-Wenham Regional High School in Massachusetts in 1971. Across approximately half a heavily wooded acre behind the school, a range of stations were installed including a low tightrope, a "monkey bridge" approximately twenty feet above ground, and a trapeze hanging about six feet away from a small platform at the top of a tall pegged pole. At this latter station, students on belay climbed the pole, stood upright on the small platform, and leaped across to try to grasp the trapeze. Students developed problem solving and collaboration skills, as well as overcoming fears and gaining confidence in their physical abilities. Another related tradition at the school was the infamous "mud walk" where students in the biology program were lashed together for a walk through the Miles River swamp which abutted the Project Adventure grounds. The shortest of students often needed to be helped by others from disappearing below the surface; this support did not always keep them from being submerged temporarily, and all clothes had to be discarded after the activity. However, students were always permitted to opt out of the Project Adventure exercises and the mud walk.

By applying Outward Bound's adventure learning principles in schools, the organization received federal funding to expand its programs across the United States. This high school is located in Hamilton Massachusetts and in 2011 placed as the 9th best school in Massachusetts. As one author wrote describing the circumstances, "In some ways, [Bob] Pieh's efforts brought the work of Kurt Hahn full circle..."

== Impact ==
Researchers have studied Project Adventure and its programming extensively. They have studied many areas, including its effects on adolescent boys, cultural development, adolescent self-conception, and several other topics.

Referred to as developing the "adventure-integrated model," the organization is attributed with developing "three foundational concepts" that have affected the field of experiential education and beyond: "Challenge by choice," the "full value contract," and goal setting. The organization is also attributed with developing the Behavior Management through Adventure model, or BMtA, which is also referred to as intentional adventure therapy. Largely credited with bringing adventure education into schools, Project Adventure is credited with influencing public education in many ways.

== See also ==
- Association for Experiential Education
- Karl Rohnke
