= Ljubičevo stable =

State-owned horse stable in Serbia

44.59747°N 21.1452°E

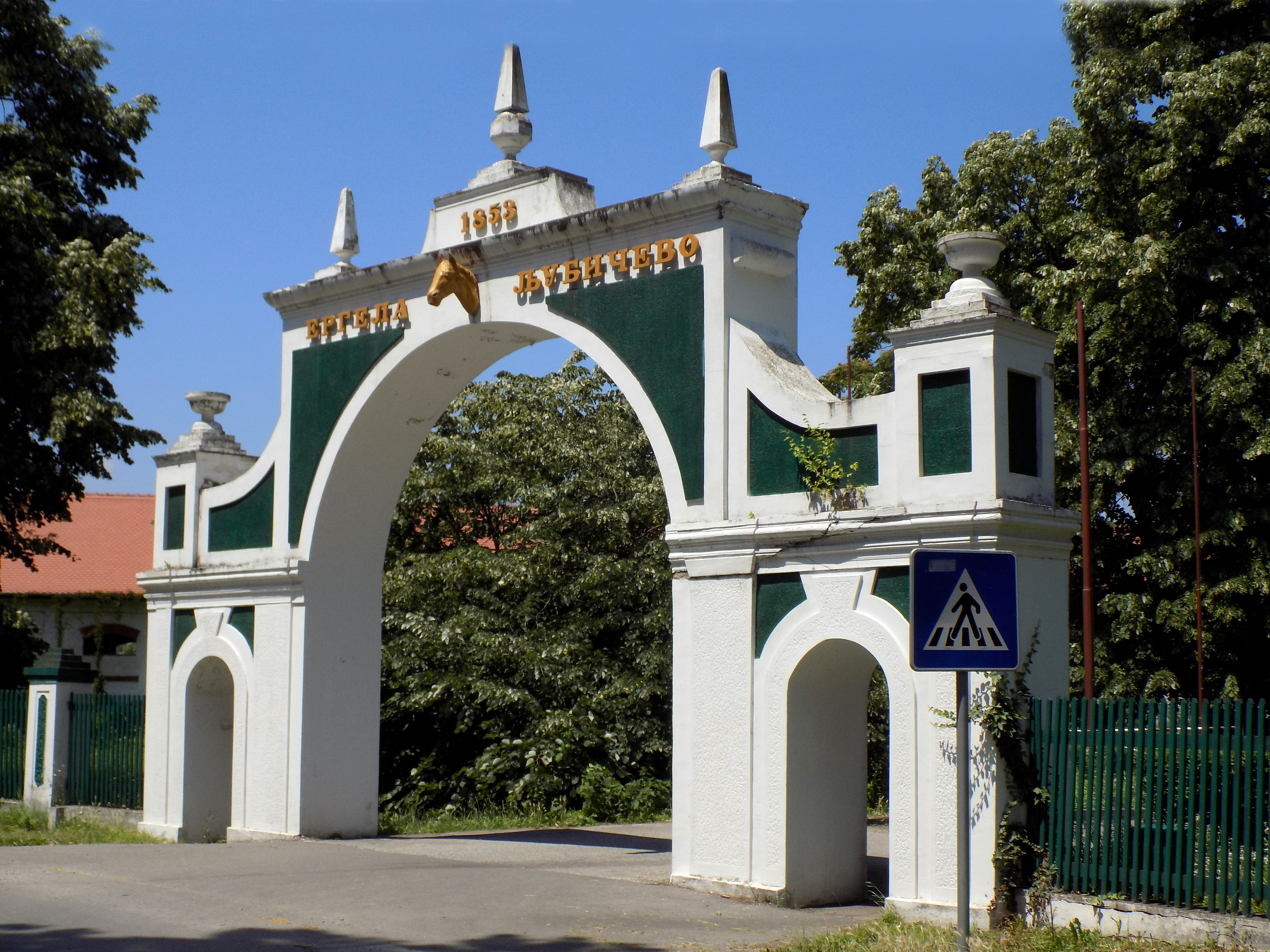
Main gate

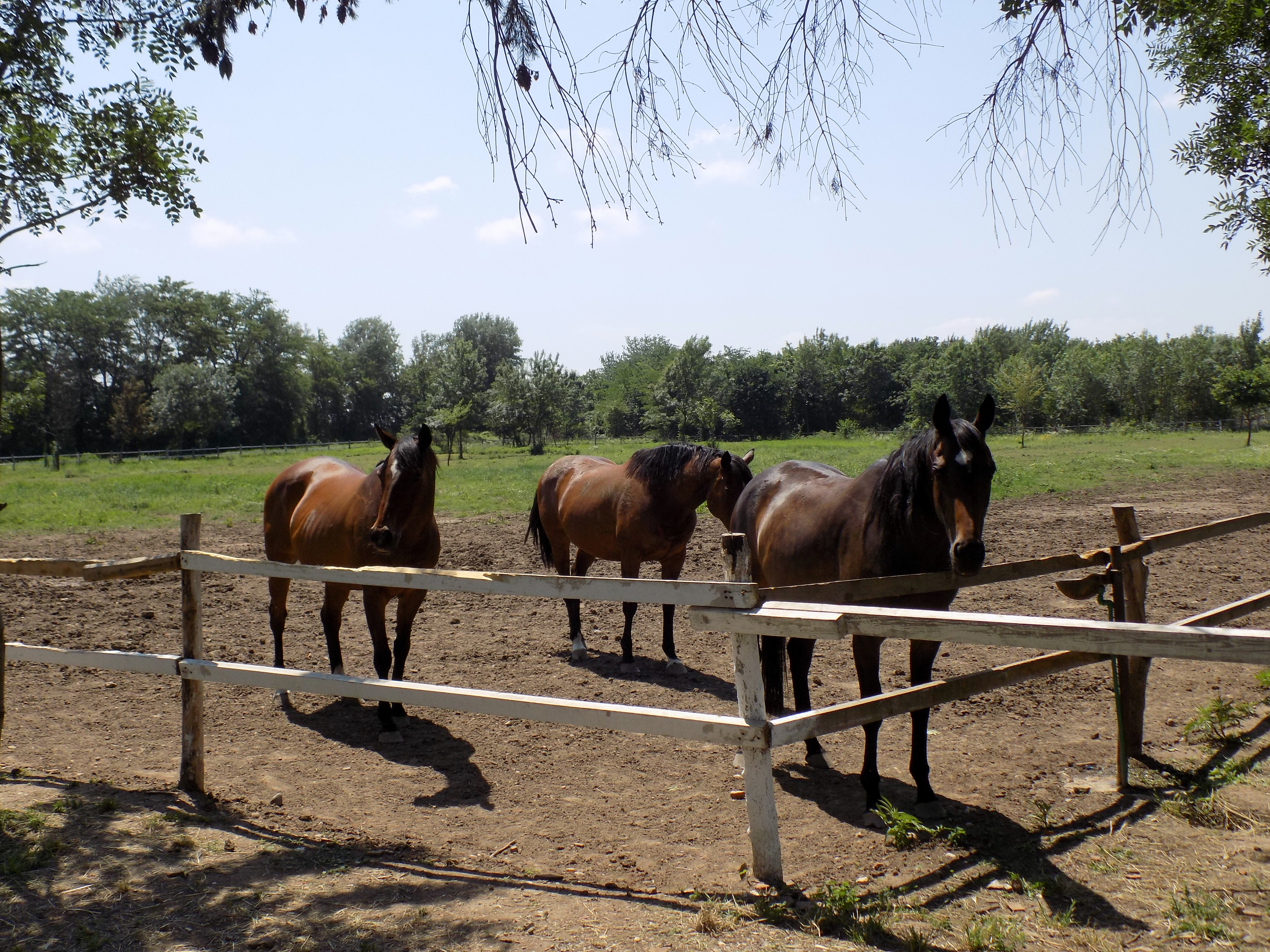
Horses in the paddock

Ljubičevo (Serbian: Љубичево) stable is the oldest equestrian facility in central Serbia, established in 1858 by the order of Miloš Obrenović. It is located on the right bank of the river Velika Morava, near Požarevac.

== History ==
Predecessor of the modern stable was an agricultural society named “Morava", after the nearby river. It was founded by Prince Miloš, on the land which he took from the local Turks in 1860, 5 km (3.1 mi) from downtown Požarevac. The prince donated the land to the state for the benefit of the people. The stable was founded with the purpose of introducing the best horse breeds to Serbia.

After Prince Mihailo Obrenović succeeded his father that same year, he took over the stable, too. The area of the complex was enlarged to 300 ha (740 acres) and in 1866 Prince Mihailo renamed it to Ljubičevo, after his mother, Princess Ljubica. A residence of Ljubičin konak was built so as the several stables next to it, where horses were bred especially for the prince who mas a major equestrian enthusiast and organized the first horse races in Serbia.

By the early 20th century, Ljubičevo advanced into the major European stable, with over 500 horses. The stable was destroyed twice, in both World Wars, but was renewed. After World War II, Ljubičevo became а military stable, but only five years later, in 1951, it lost this status because of the modernization of the military.

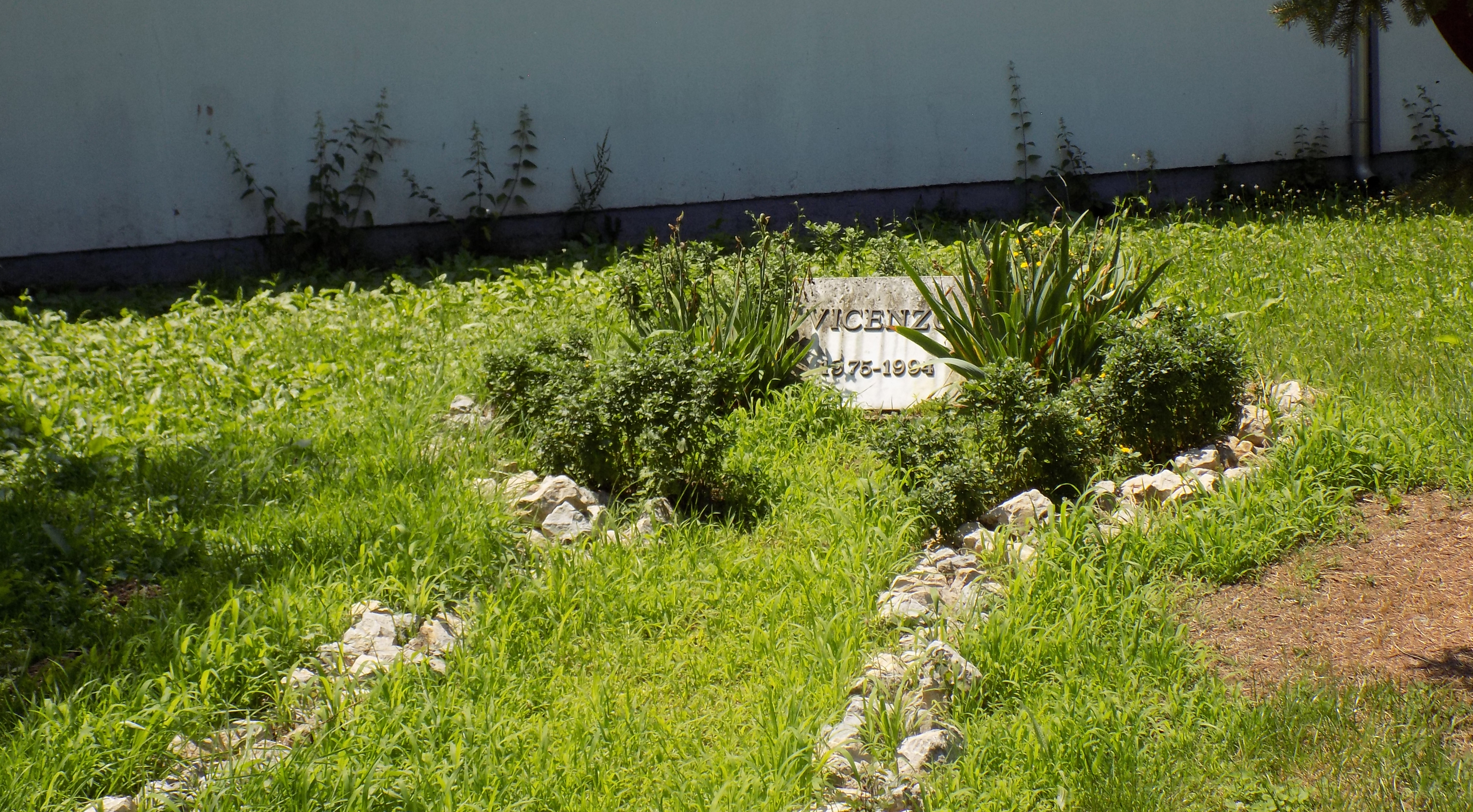
Memorial plaque to one of the champion horses, Vicenzo

The stable flourished again in the mid-1960s, when the Ljubičevo Equestrian Games, as a tourist attraction, were founded. To the first horse winning horse who won the tournament, Ljubičevac, a monument was erected in 1974, in the central part of the complex, close to the administrative building. There is also a memorial plaque to Vičenca, a British-imported stud who won numerous races and had numerous champion offspring who dominated the races in the 1980s.

With the general collapse of the economy in the 1990s, the stable was reduced to 60 horses and stopped participating in the games on other hippodromes. The manjež, training ground was closed in this period, but was restored by 2018. Also an adventure park, the trim trail and an outdoor gym were built. Ljubičevo also remains the only state-owned horse stable in Serbia.

== Equestrian tournament ==
Equestrian tournament was held for the first time in the year 1964 in Požarevac .One of the reason for founding was orientation to tourism since in 1951 Ljubicevo stopped being military stable. Nowadays Equestrian tournament is held in the first weekend in September and they are preceded by official parade and carnival through the center of Požarevac, as well as the others coultural events.

== Gallery ==
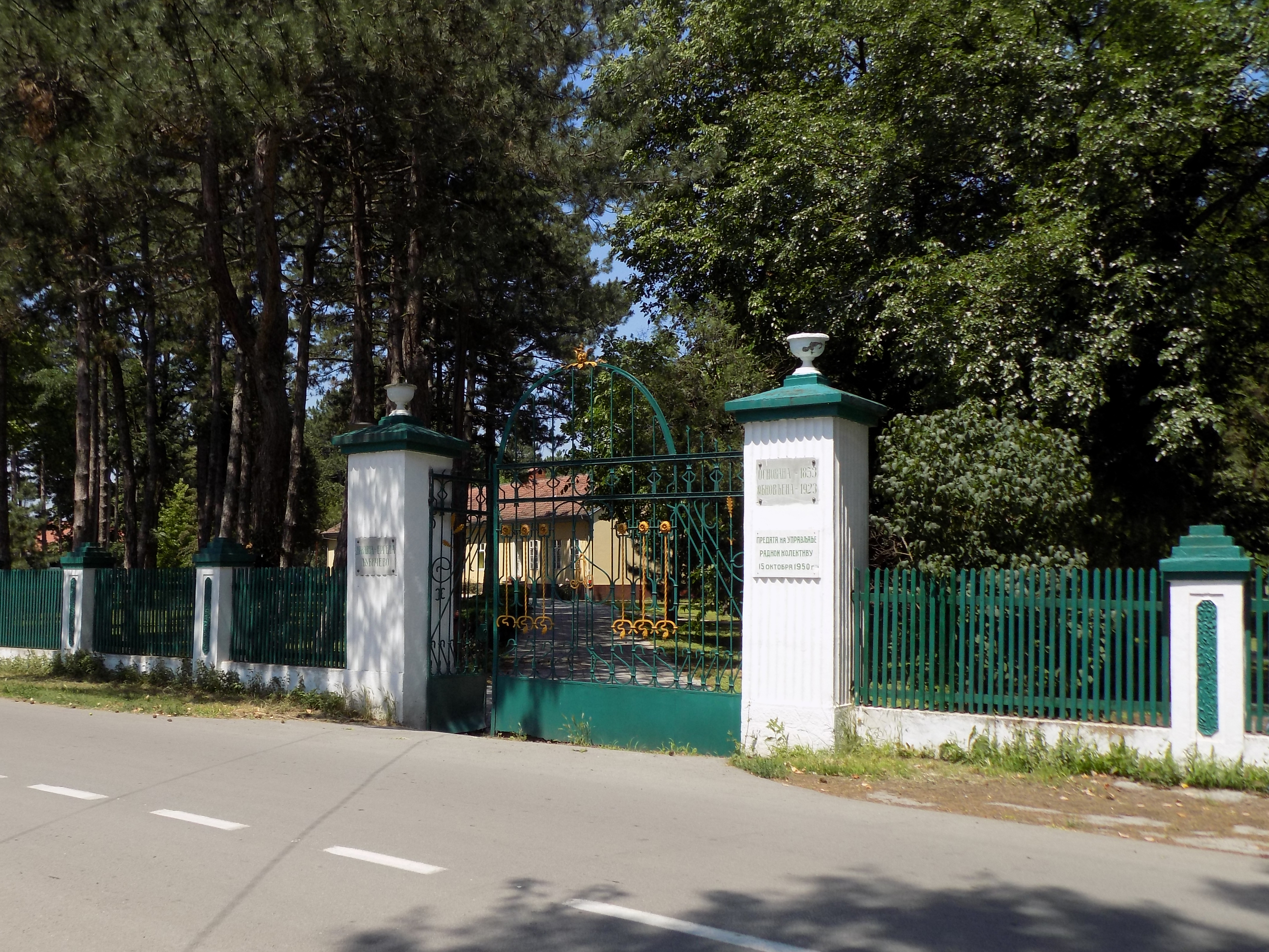
Side gate

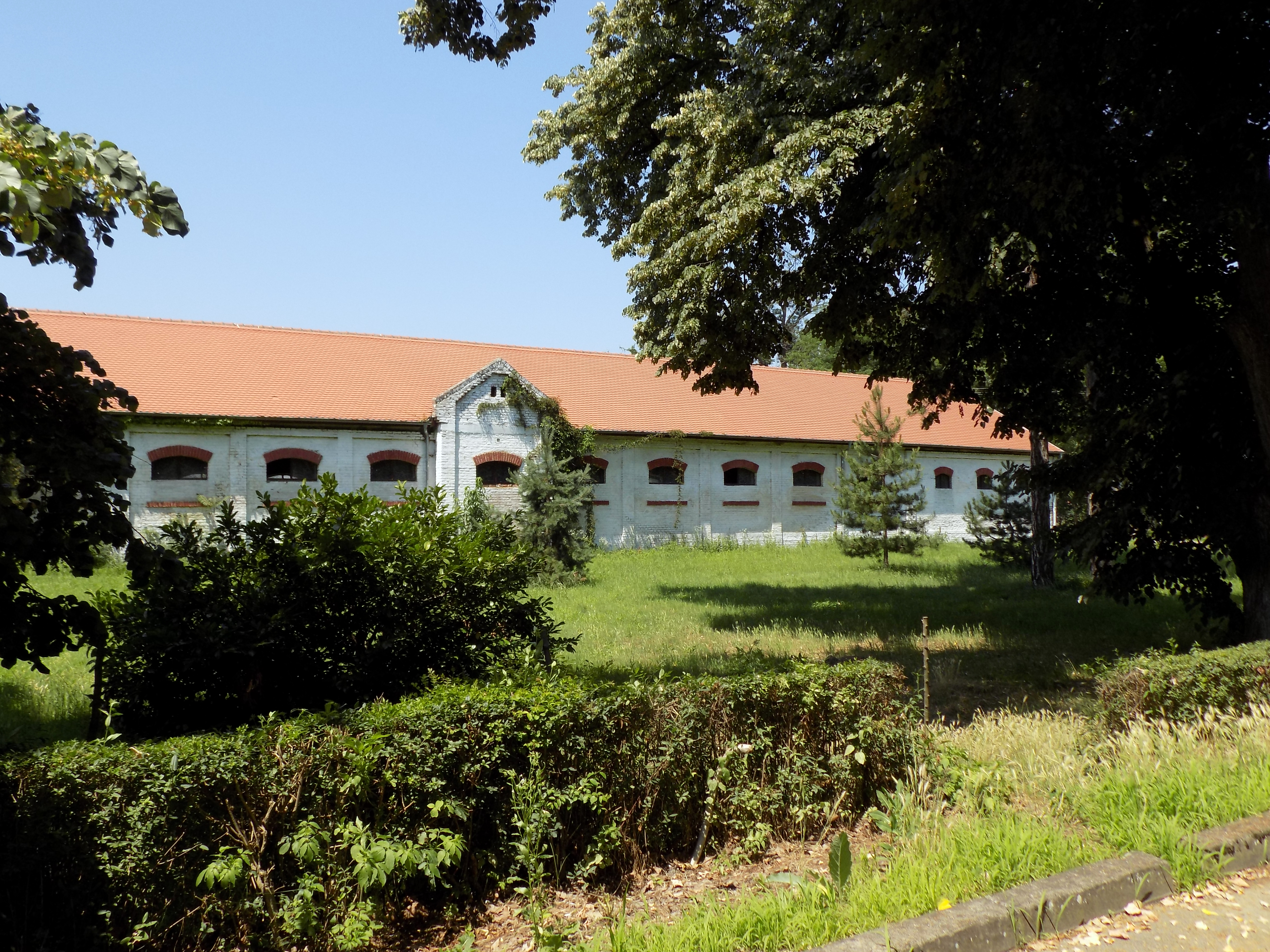
Stables

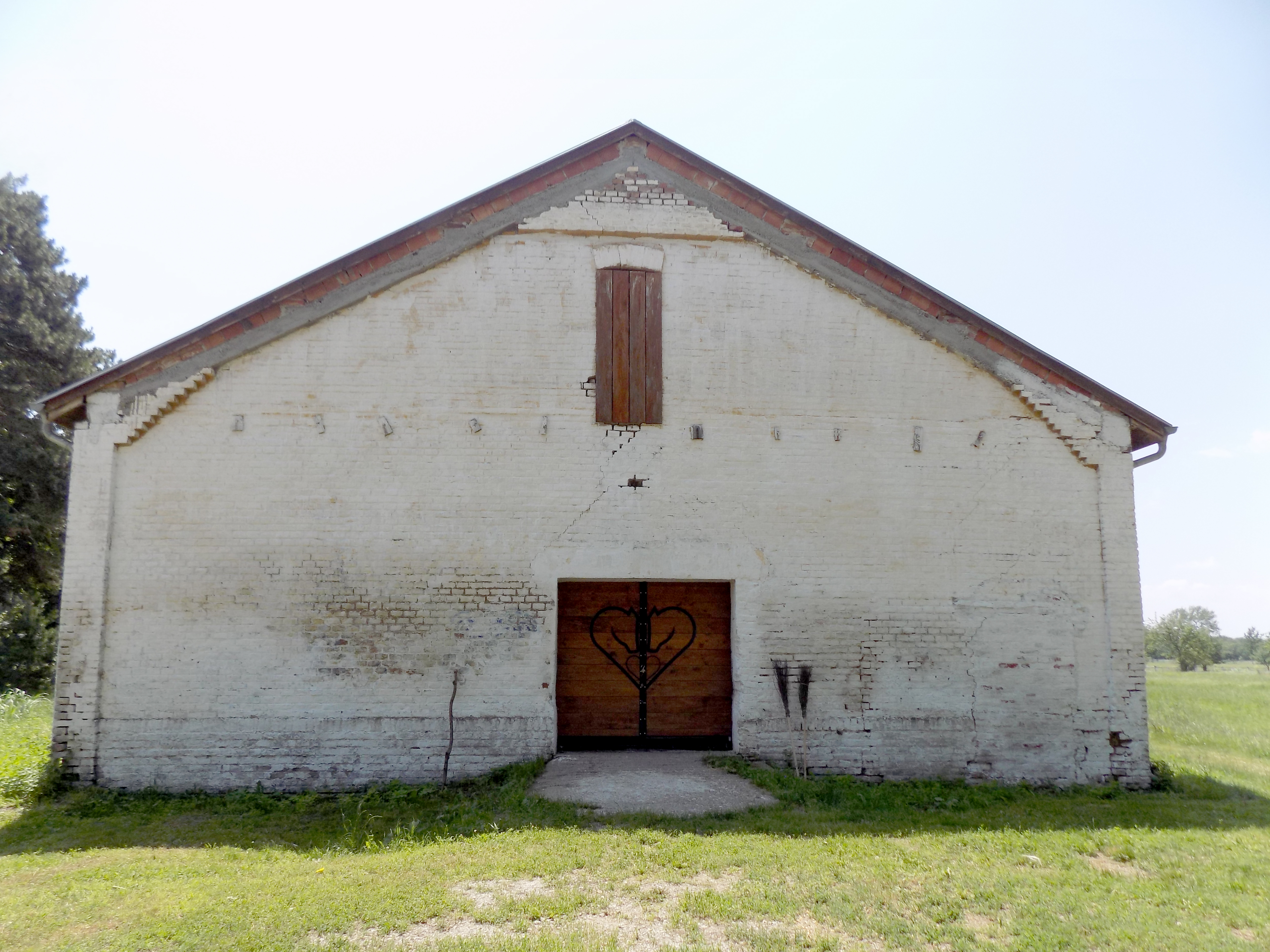
Manege

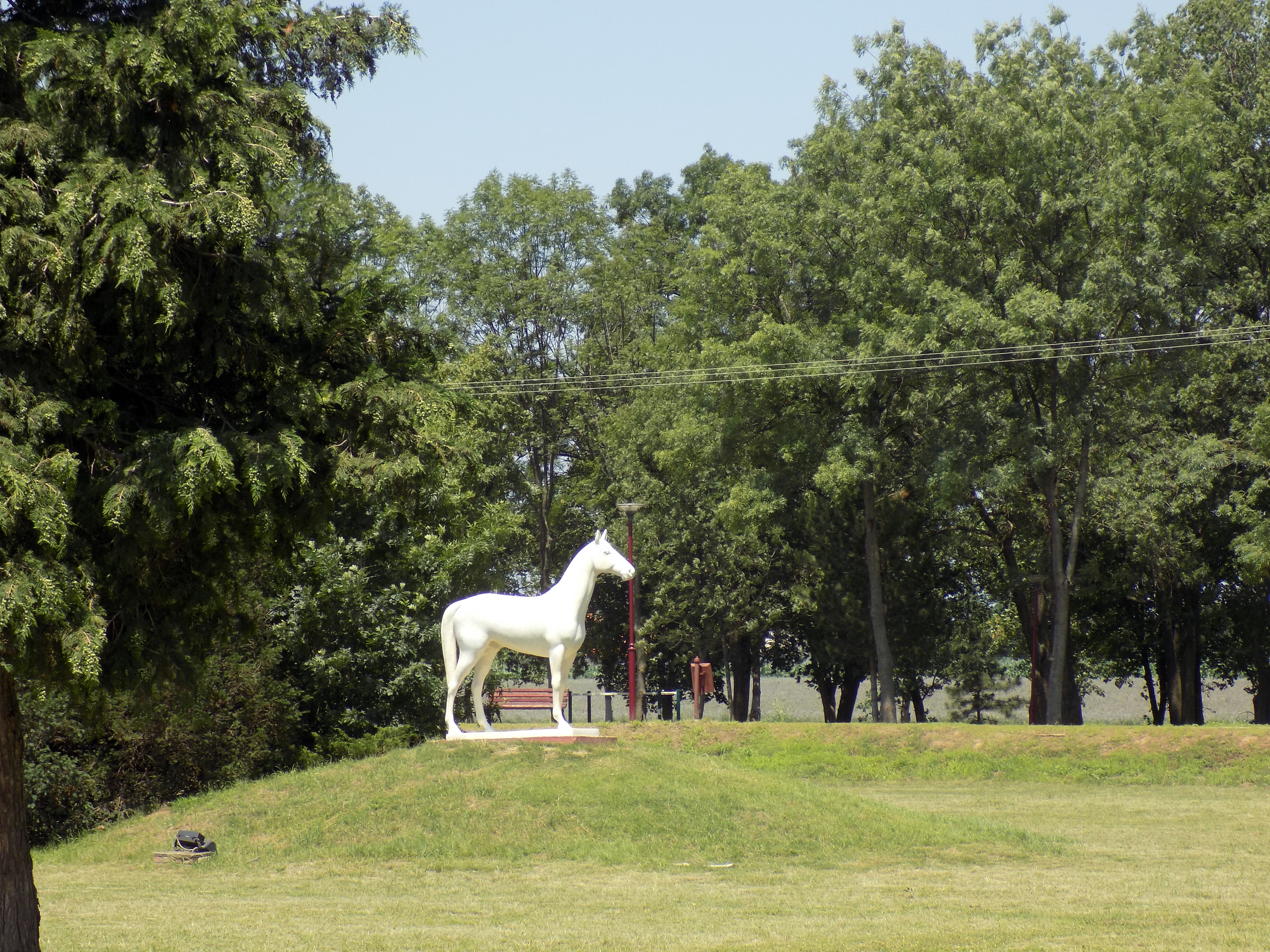
A monument to the most famous horse of the stud farm, Ljubičevac

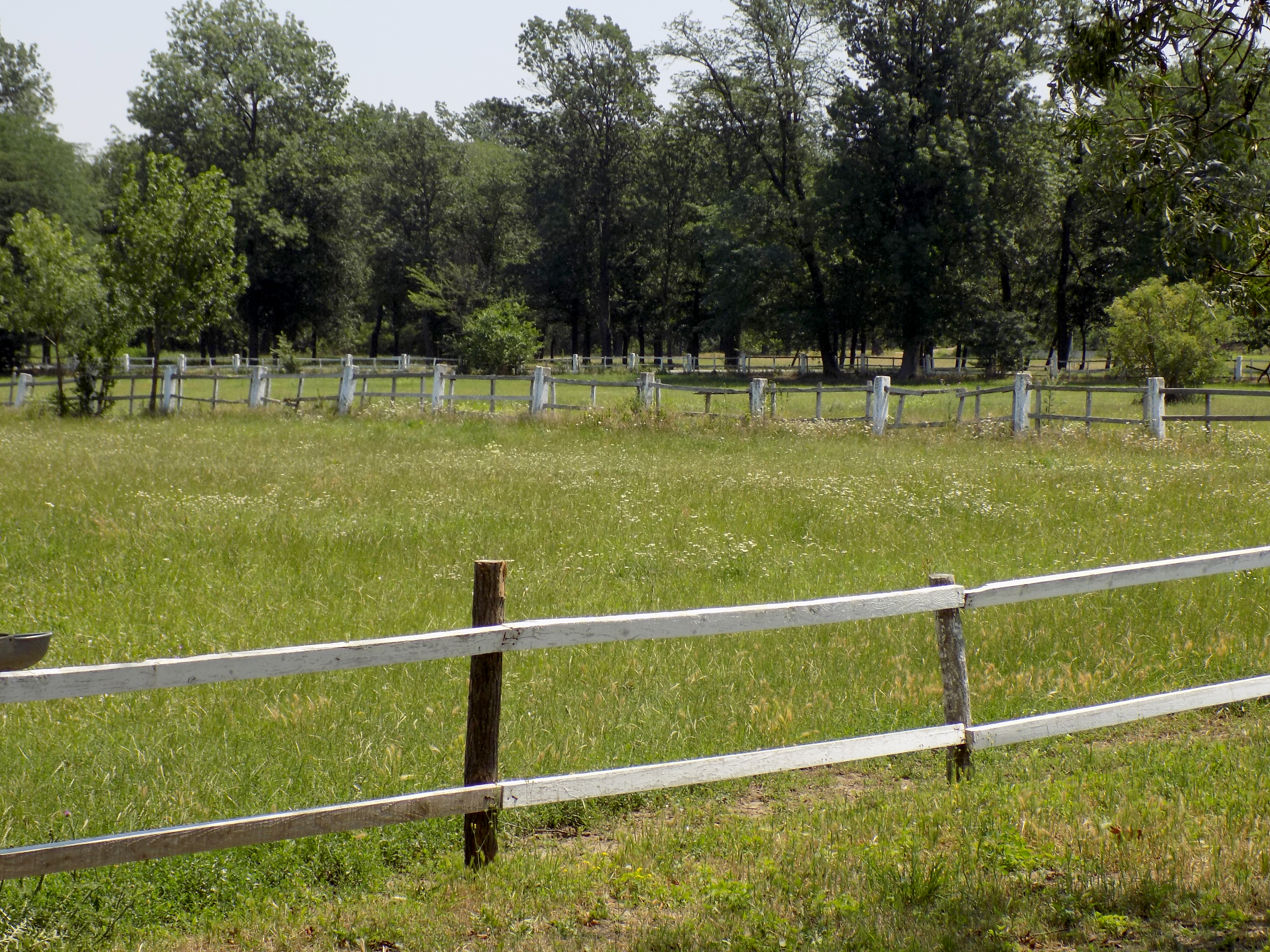
One of the paddocks

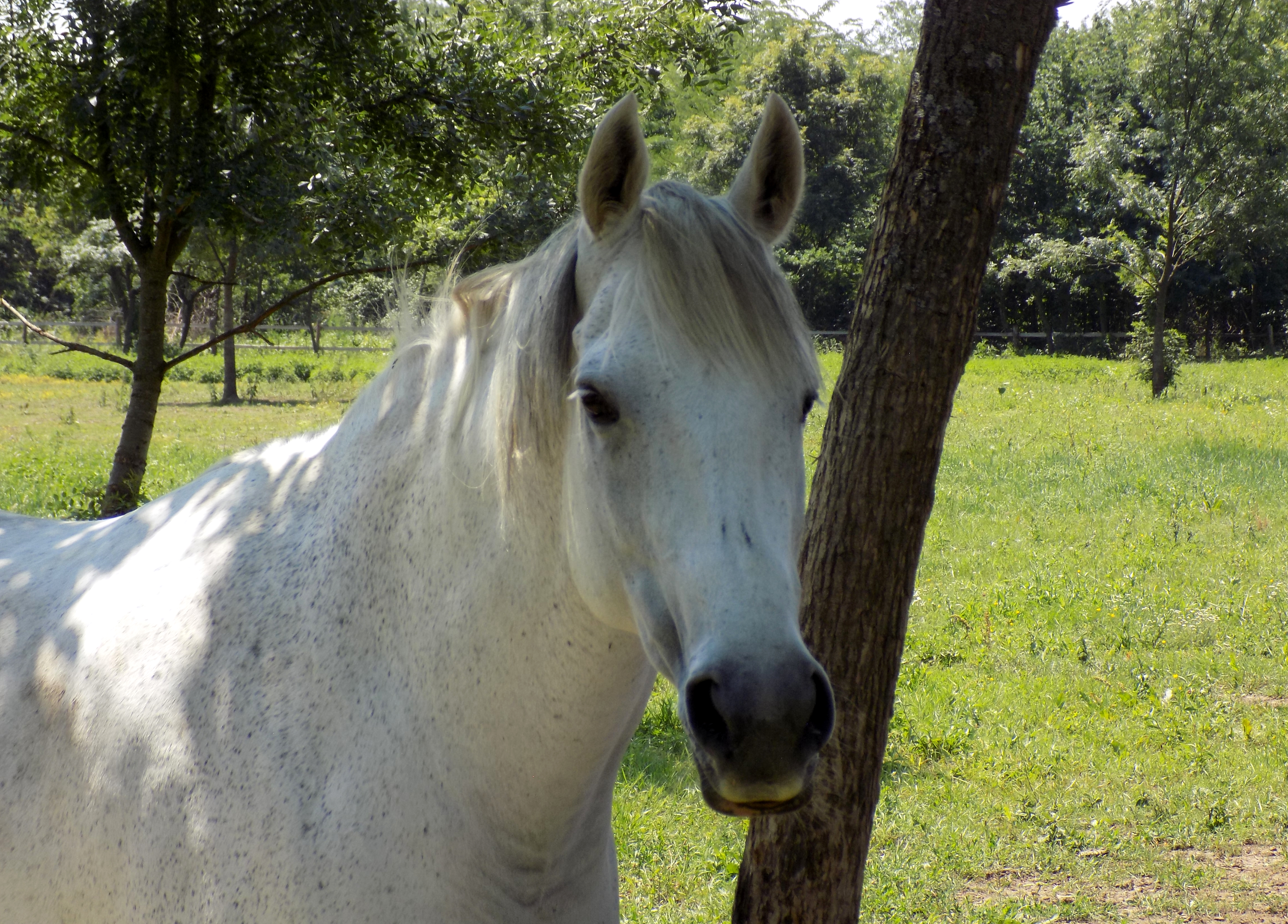
Lipizzaner in the stable
