= Ropes course =

Outdoor training activity

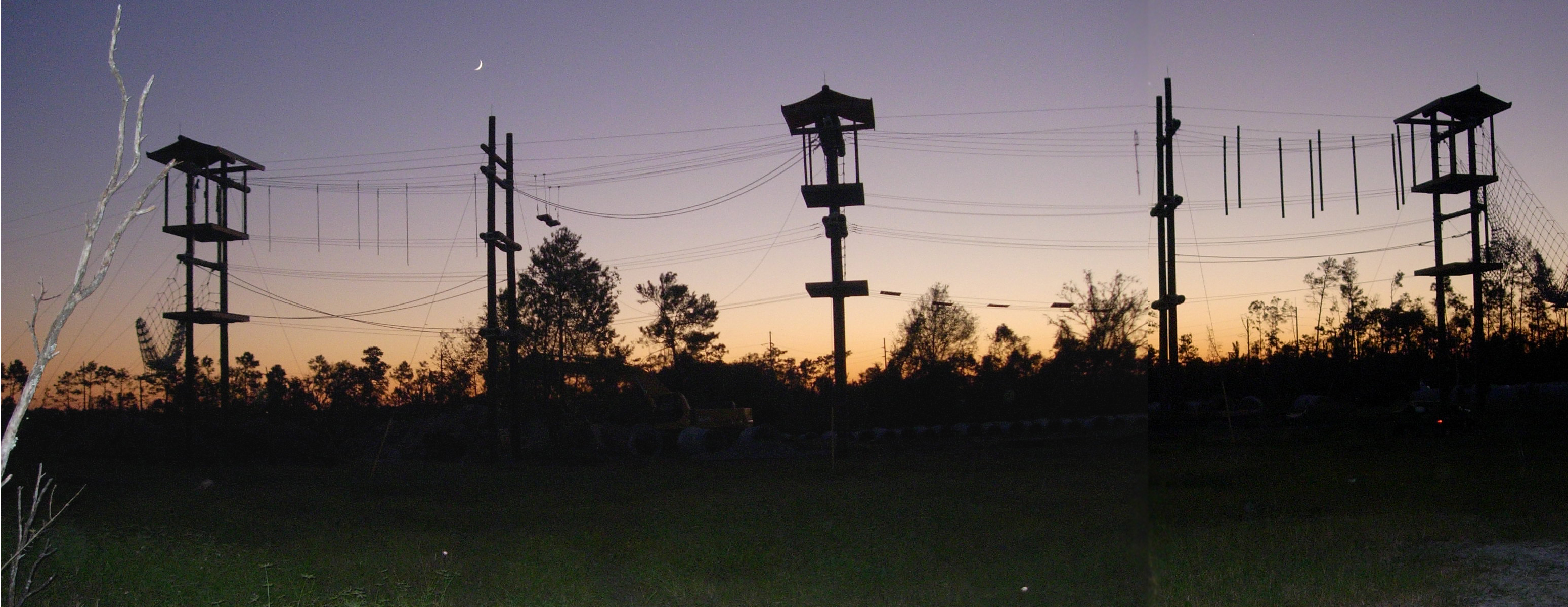
Example of a high ropes course at night

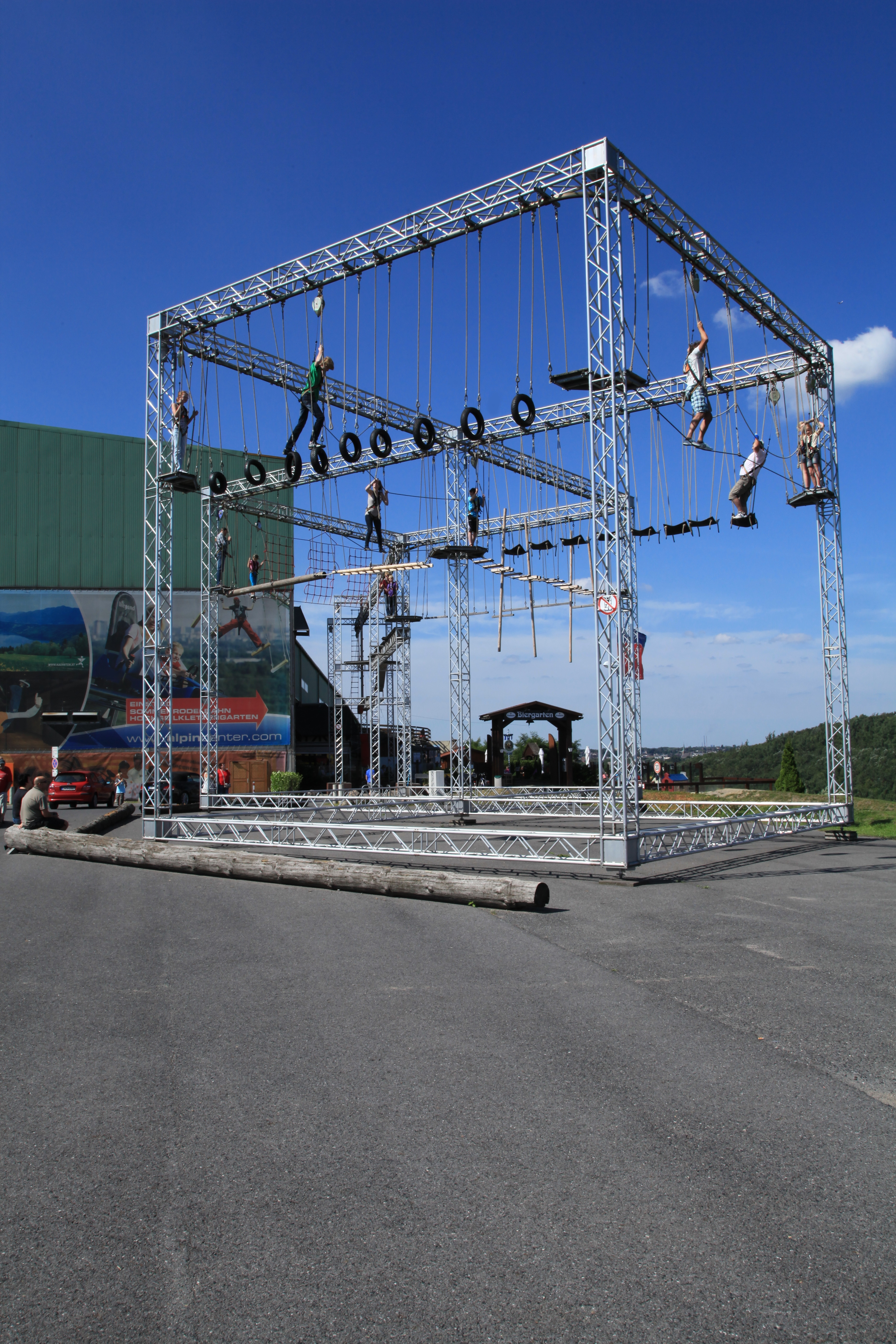
Rope climbing at the Alpine Center Bottrop, built by insight-out, Germany

A ropes course is a challenging outdoor personal development and team building activity which usually consists of high elements, low elements, or some combination of the two. Low elements take place on the ground or above the ground. High elements are usually constructed in trees or made of utility poles and require a belay for safety.

== Terminology ==
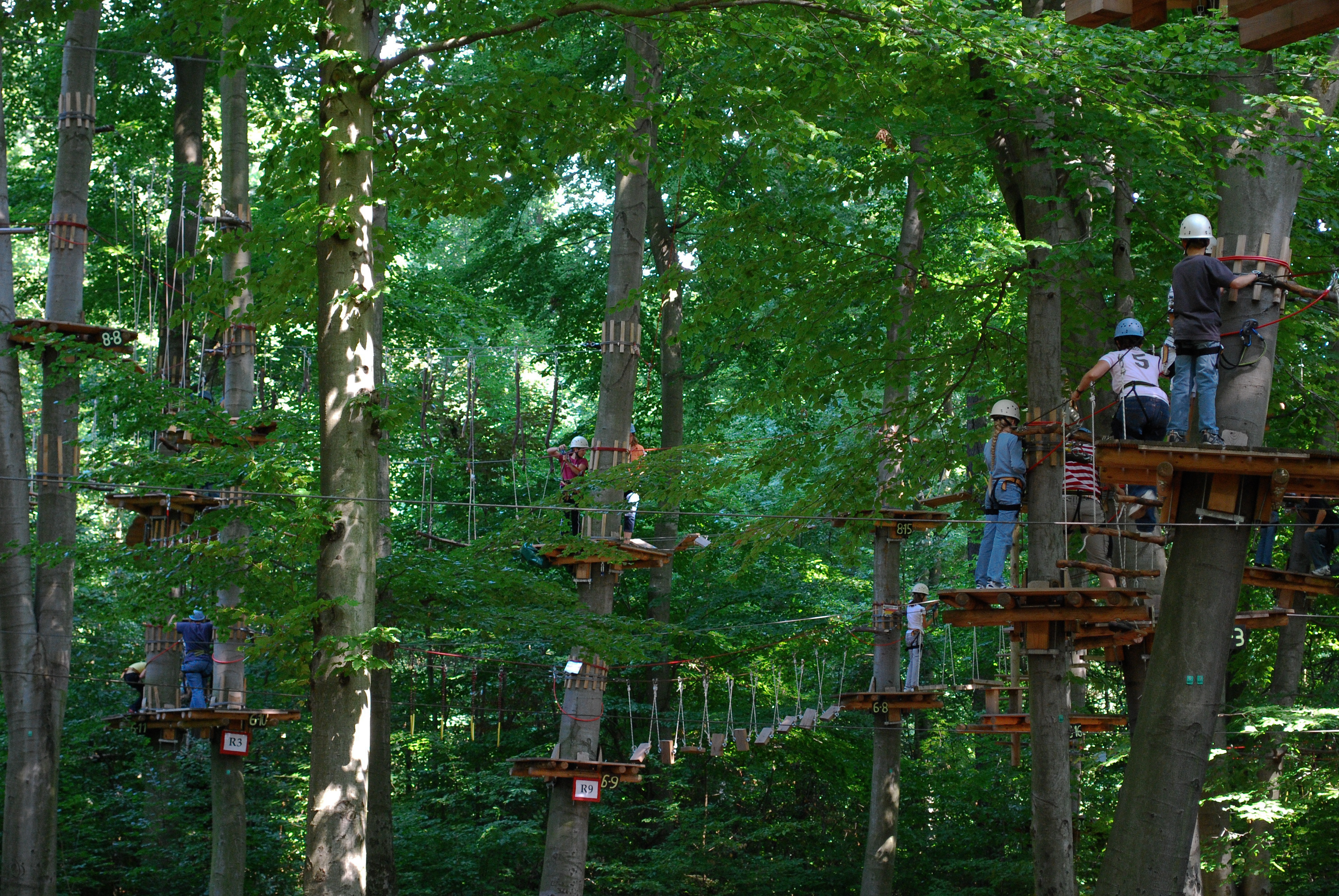
Adventure Park in a forest

Ropes courses are referred to using several different names, including Challenge Courses, Ropes Challenge Courses, Teams Course, and Low Ropes, as well as more idiosyncratic names such as the Challenging Outdoor Personal Experience (Project COPE) course (used by the Boy Scouts of America).

An Aerial Adventure Park (or "European-Style" Adventure Park, Tree-Top Adventure course) has a more recreational purpose.

Other related terms include obstacle courses, assault courses and commando courses, although these terms also have slightly different meanings, often more associated with military training than with education and training for the general public.

== History ==
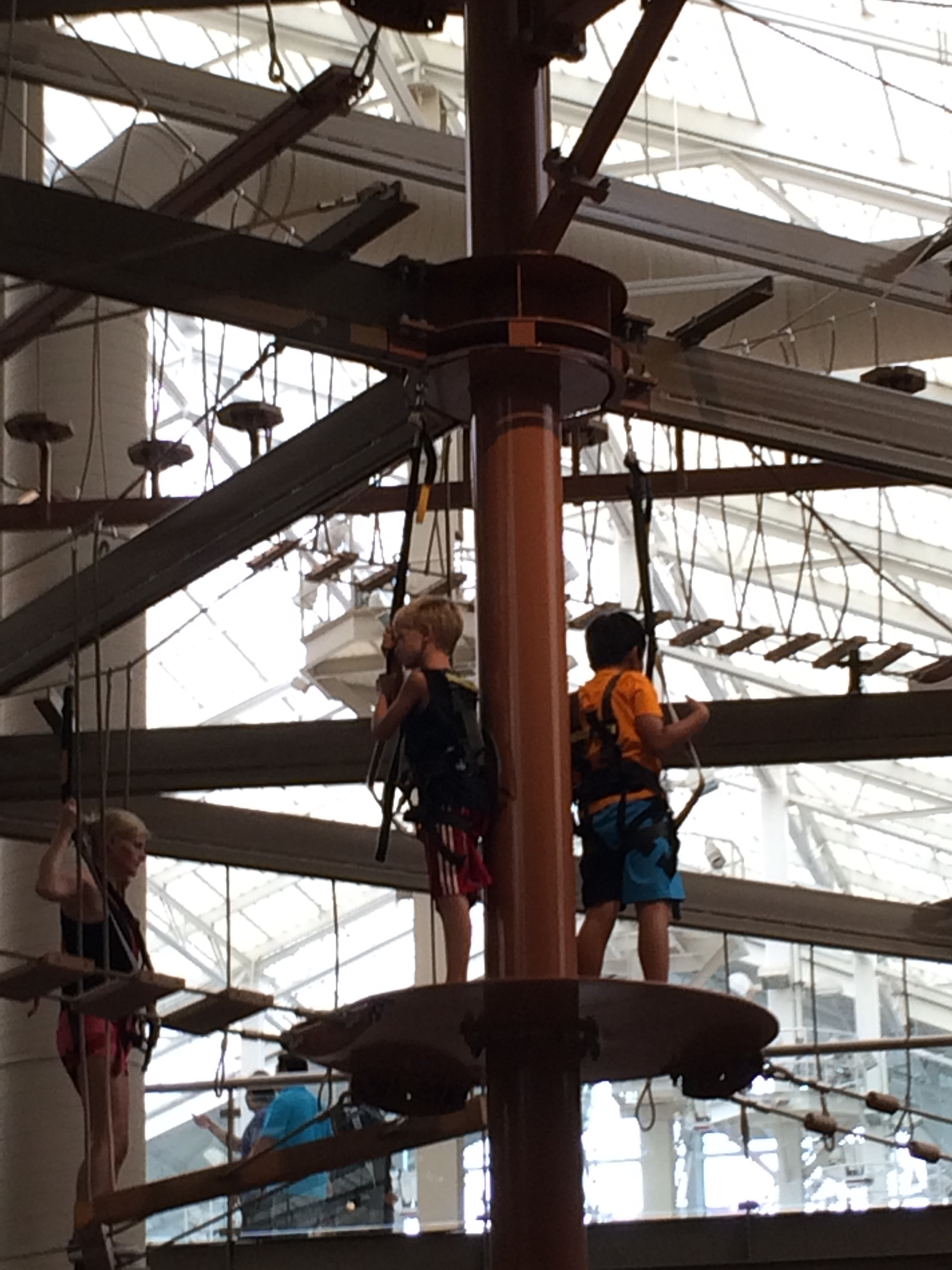
Two boys climbing on the Palisades Climb Adventure, an indoor rope course at Palisades Mall, West Nyack, New York

It is unclear where and when the first ropes course was created. Obstacle courses have been used by the military to train soldiers as far back as the ancient Greeks. Those courses, however, were primarily used for the training of extremely fit individuals and not necessarily aimed at the development of unremarkable persons as is common practice on ropes courses today. The use of belay and risk management systems on such courses was limited and often non-existent.

Many practitioners cite Georges Hébert as the originator of the "modern" ropes course. A French naval officer in the early 1900s, Hébert developed his own method of physical education, apparatus, and principles to train in what he called the “Natural Method,” which included the development of physical, moral, and “virile” qualities in an outdoor environment. Drawing from his naval background, Hébert patterned some of his obstacles on obstacles found on the decks of ships. “Hébertism” grew during and between the World Wars, becoming the standard for physical education training for the French military. Many ropes courses and challenge course programs in French Canada and Europe are still known as Hébertism courses today.

Marble, Colorado, the site of the first Colorado Outward Bound course, has been cited as the location of the first ropes course in the US, although this is highly unlikely. Patterned after a military obstacle course and similar to the course in use at the Outward Bound school in Aberdyfi, Wales, the course was constructed of hemp ropes. Belay systems were minimal or non-existent.

Ropes courses were adapted for use in an education setting by Project Adventure, Inc. in Hamilton, Massachusetts in 1971. The first course built at the school still stands and is in use today.

== Modern courses ==
Since the 1980s, ropes course sophistication has evolved considerably. Modern ropes courses incorporate sophisticated belay and safety systems using wire rope, friction devices, and climbing harnesses to manage what before were unmanaged risks. Recent technological advances in pole hardware and climbing equipment along with industry-accepted installation and design practices have greatly reduced the risk to end users and to the natural environment. Modern courses make use of a variety of materials other than trees, including utility poles and steel structures.

New, mobile high ropes courses and climbing walls built on flat bed trucks, initiated by a recent trend, have made challenge courses more available to the public for recreational purposes and are generating publicity.

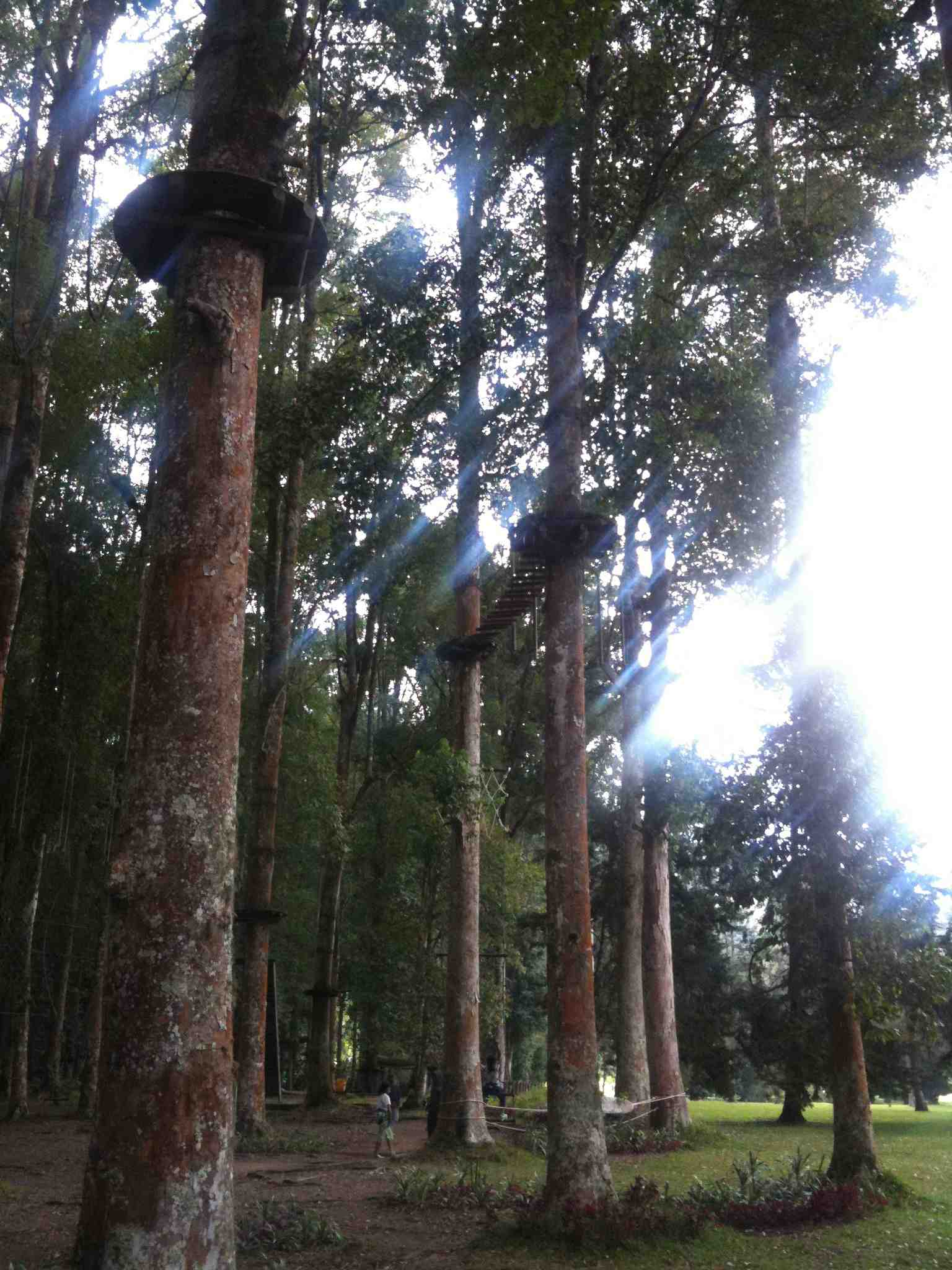
Adventure Park in Bali

Adventure Parks with a more recreational-orientation are booming in Europe and awake a great interest in the US and around the globe. They are usually designed for a larger volume of visitors. They do not follow a specific educational concept, but see the individual, physical and mental challenge as a predominantly recreational activity. Neither climbing techniques nor special/specific physical fitness experience are necessary. Typical slogans are: Have fun, Test your Courage and Overcome your Own Fears. In an Adventure Park, the participants independently run a variety of trails of increasing difficulty levels. Each trail consists of several poles or trees that are connected by different acrobatic elements.

== Types of courses ==
=== High course ===
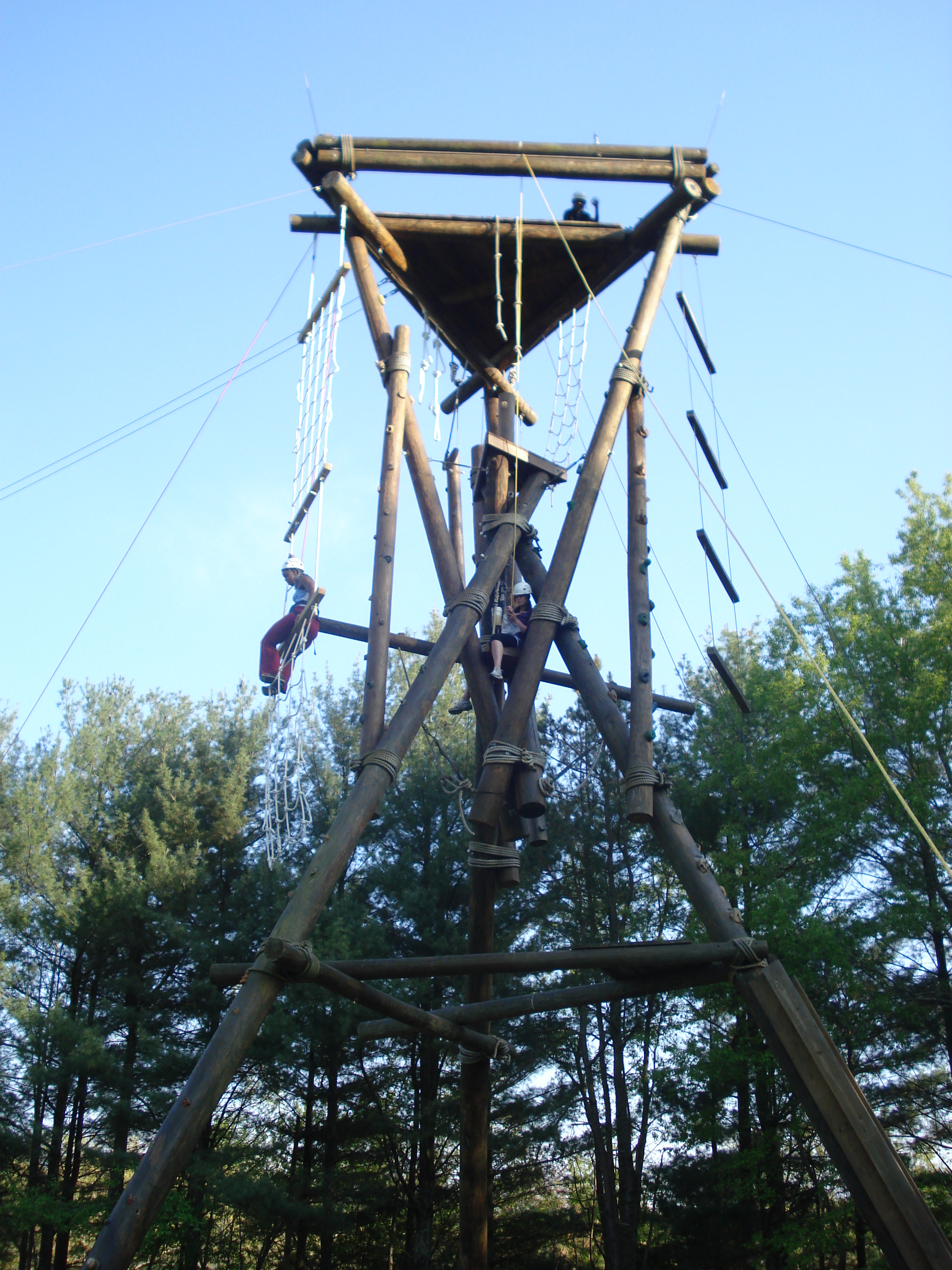
An alpine tower at Warren Wilson College

A high course can be a pre-fabricated, professionally installed course, built of utility poles, cables, and bolts, or it can be a course that is hand-built in a wooded area, where ropes and wire are attached to different trees.

Ropes courses can be described as static, dynamic, vertical, and M-Belay. With a static course, participants are attached to an upper wire, belay cable, with lanyards (ropes and carabiners) for safety. If the participant dangles, they will be caught by the wire. Advantages of a static course include needing fewer facilitators, being able to get more participants up on the course at one time, and allowing participants to do multiple elements without having to be lowered and climb back up after each. On a dynamic course, participants are connected to a rope, which someone on the ground will be holding onto and belaying the participant on the course. Participants on a dynamic course remain on a belay the entire time: climbing up to the element, doing the activity, and being lowered to the ground after. A vertical course is very similar to dynamic, except that the element is the climb up. Vertical courses can be: vertical obstacle courses with hanging logs, ladders, and tires or alpine towers with their unique hour-glass shape of activities. The M-Belay is the most complicated of the two, and involves two separate belays. Otherwise, it is very similar to a dynamic course.

Usually participants must sign a waiver before being allowed to participate on the course, because of the high risk of injury. Some participants may have a hard time completing the course due to its height and the physical challenge. Courses usually range from 25 feet through 50 feet tall, though some elements can reach upwards of 150 feet plus (as in the redwoods and some jungle courses). In order to climb up onto the course participants usually must climb, such as by using a cargo net or Jacob's Ladder, which could be made of rope, or an artificial climbing wall.

=== Low course ===
Low ropes courses consist of a series of real and imaginary obstacles designed to challenge groups and individuals to work together to accomplish a task. The classification of low ropes courses can be further broken into several types of activities:

- Cooperative Game, Socialization Activity, Ice-Breaker: a fun activity designed to reduce inhibitions and break down barriers. These activities are often not based on a defined task but on a sequence of events. Users are often placed in positions where they are encouraged to try new things that may place them outside their normal comfort zones. Examples include: name games, people to people, raccoon circle...
- Group Initiative: problems involving real and imaginary ground-based obstacles (either natural or constructed) that challenge a group to pool their resources and work together to find solutions. Success is achieved only when all members have contributed to the outcome. Examples include: The Muese, Spider's Web, Carpet Maze, Crocodile Pit, Whale Watch, Peanut Butter River, Ragging River, T.P. Shuffle, Nitro Crossing, and Group Wall
- Trust-building games: activities designed to provide members the opportunity to demonstrate their trust in other members of the group through a series of sequenced actions. Examples include: Willows in the Wind and Trust Fall.
- Low Ropes Elements: a series of cables, ropes, and obstacles strung between trees or poles, 12 to 18 inches above the ground, low rope elements present tests of physical strength, stamina, agility, balance, and flexibility, and invite participants to confront such emotional issues as the fear of falling, the fear of failure, and the fear of losing control. Risk is managed by group members who assume critical spotting roles. Examples include: Swinging Balance Beam, Triangle Traverse, Tire Swings, and Mohawk Walk.
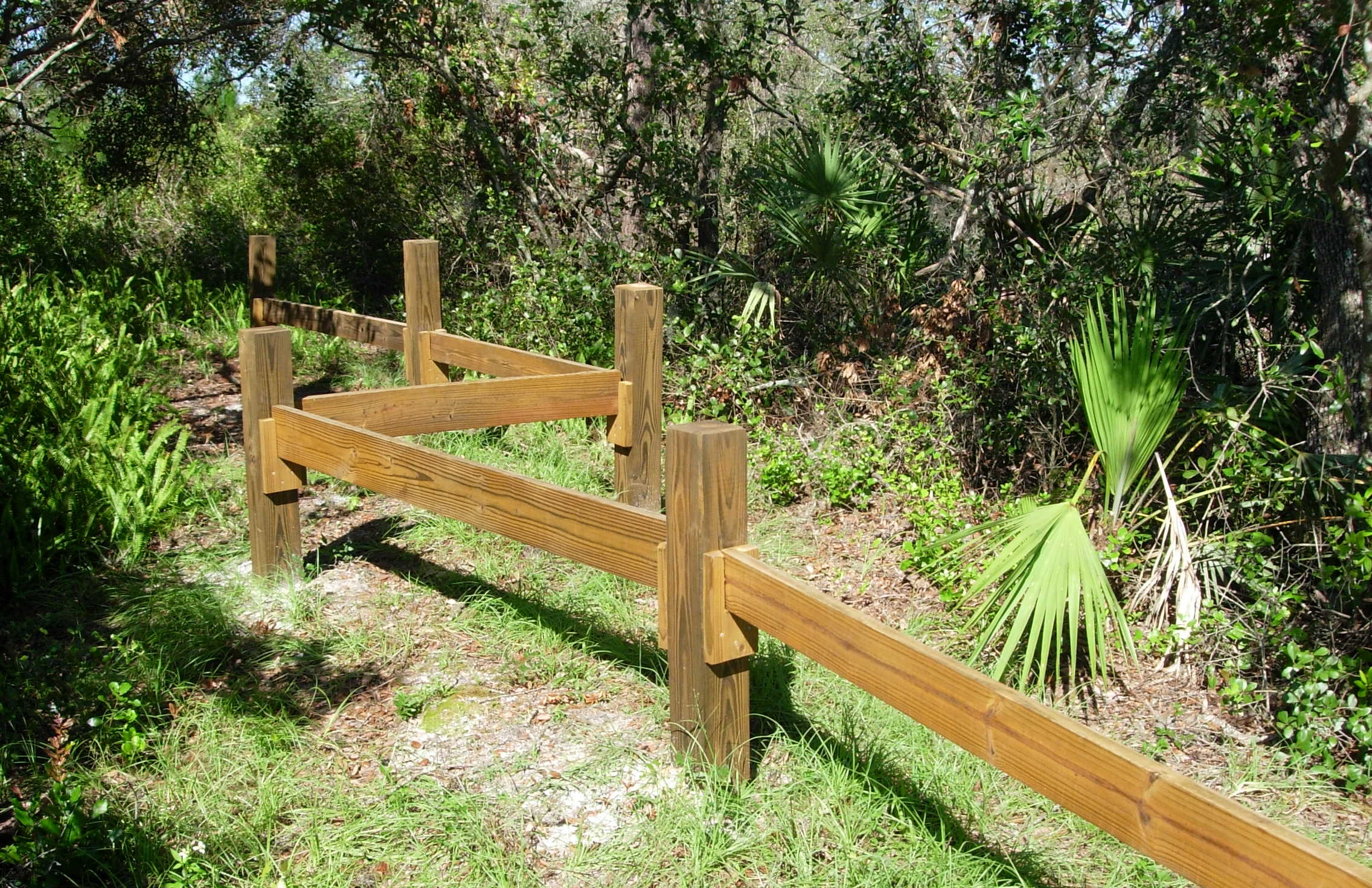
Zig Zag

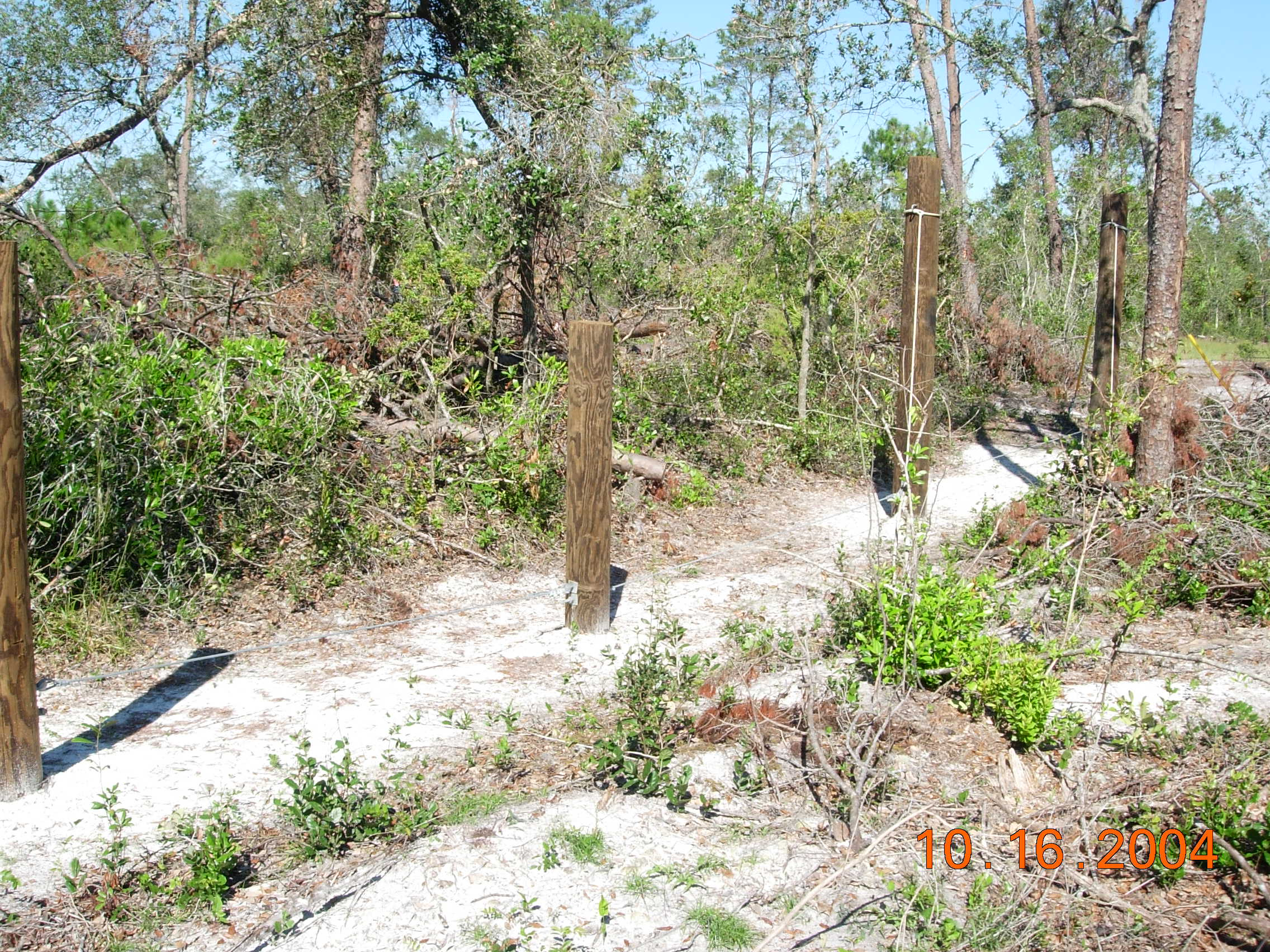
Mohawk Walk

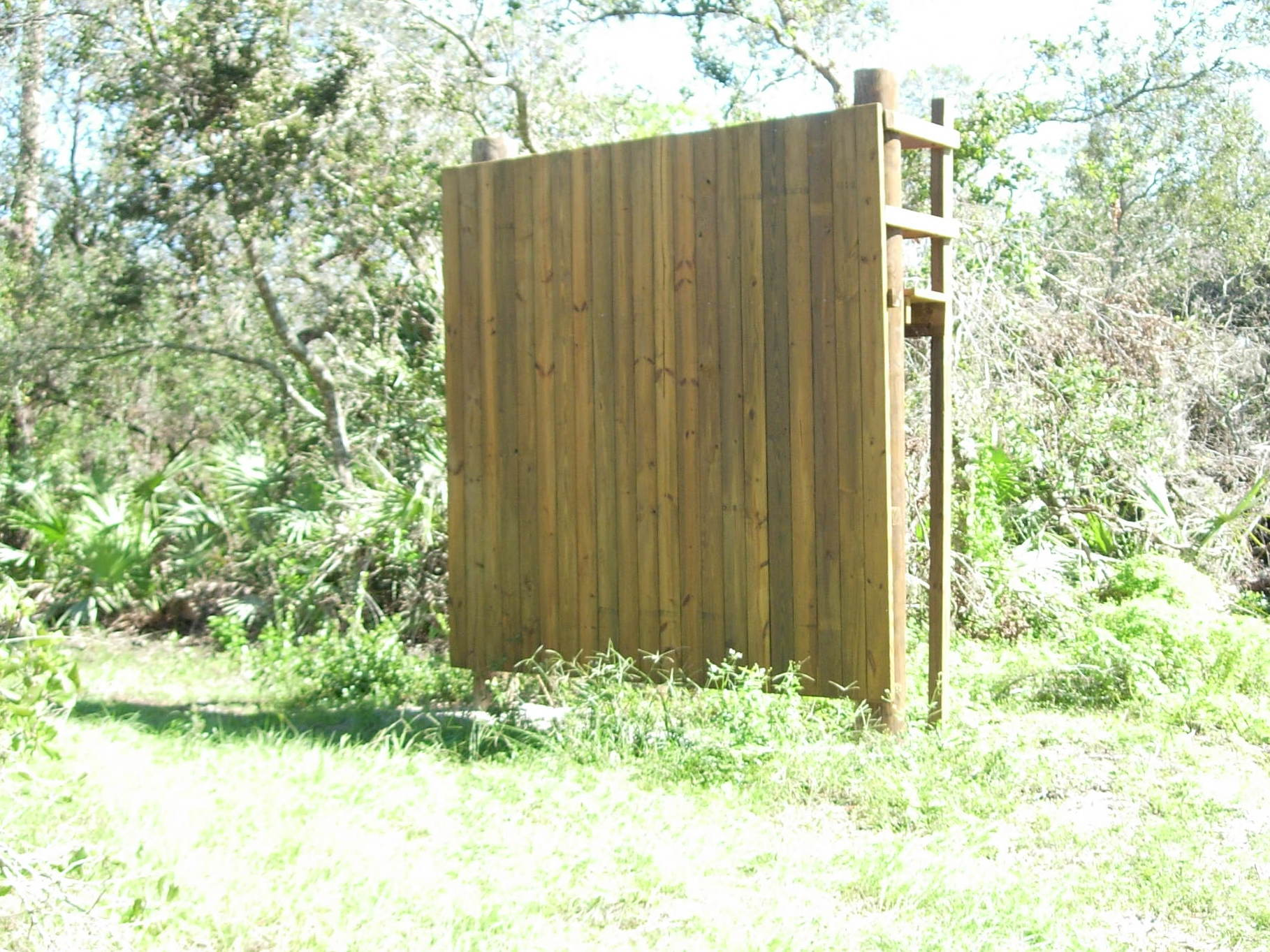
The Wall

== Purpose ==
Ropes course advocates claim that they meet a number of educational, developmental, and recreational goals. High ropes course and climbing programs generally focus on personal achievements and ask participants to confront their personal fears and anxieties. Challenges may be physical or emotional. In certain cases, high element programs involve the development and mastery of technical skills to manage rope belay systems used to secure other climbers as they move through the course. In such cases, outcomes often include exploring the fundamentals of trust, craftsmanship, and coaching. Programs using low ropes course elements or group initiatives are most often designed to explore group interaction, problem-solving, and leadership. Some of the commonly claimed outcomes include enhancement of cooperation, decision making, self confidence, positive risk-taking, social cohesion, trust, self esteem, leadership, goal setting, and teamwork. In addition to these commonly cited benefits, a study published in 2000 in the Journal of Leisure Research found that ropes courses also demonstrate higher-level outcomes, including increases in effectiveness and efficiency, building relationships, developing understanding, setting goals, brainstorming ideas and task accomplishment.

The British Royal Marines have a difficult ropes course dubbed the 'Tarzan Assault Course'. To pass the Commando Course, recruits must complete this and other tests consecutively under a strict time limit.

== Research ==
Despite the development of ropes course programming during the latter part of the 20th century and the increasing sophistication and professionalism in ropes course construction, there remains a lack of clear scientific consensus about the many claimed psychosocial training benefits of ropes course participation.

== See also ==
- Adventure therapy
- Group-dynamic game
- Karl Rohnke
- Outdoor education
- Project Adventure
- Trainasium
- Via ferrata
