= Karl Rohnke =

Karl E. Rohnke
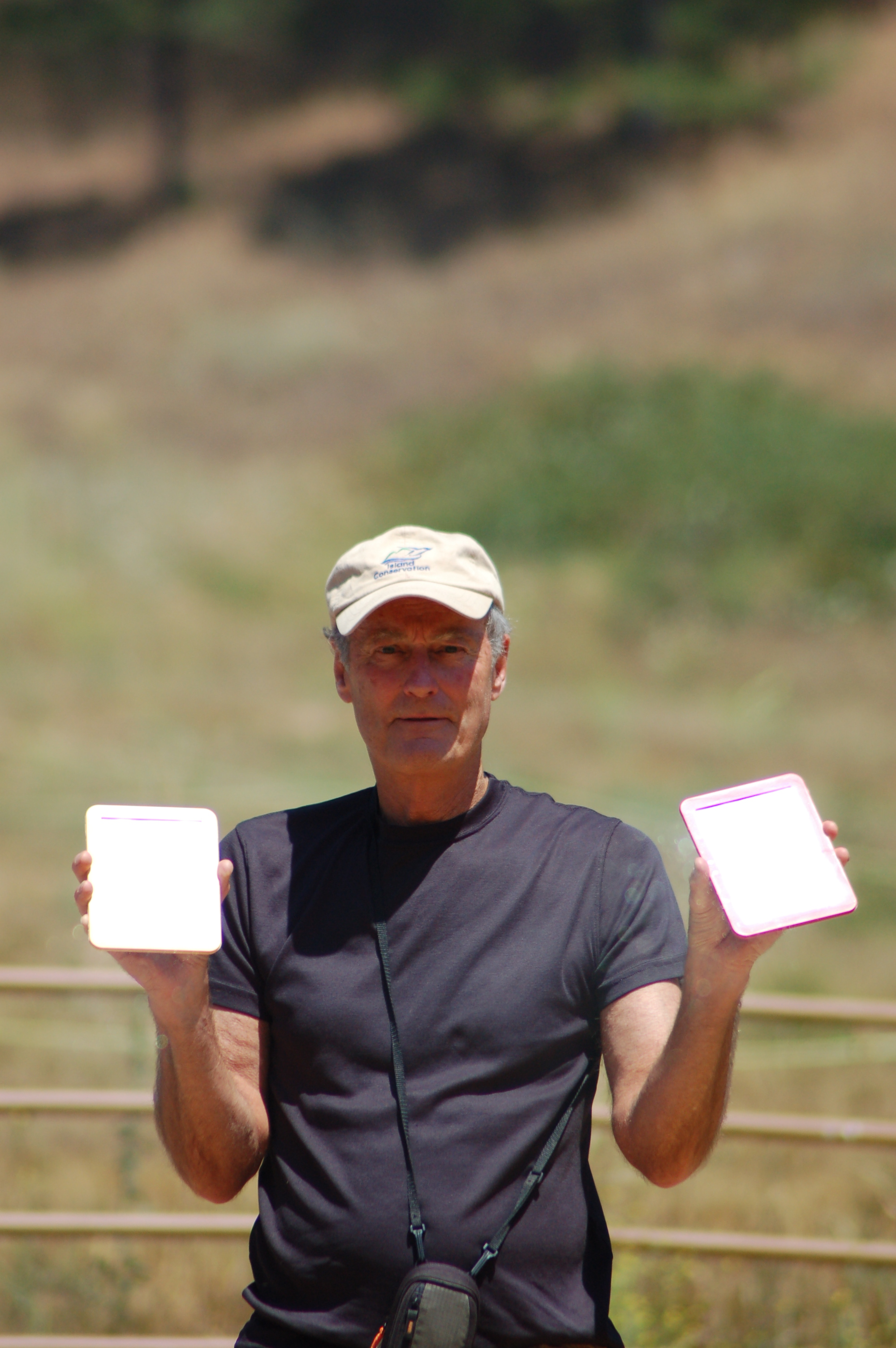
- Born: 28 May 1937; Neptune, NJ
- Died: 20 September 2020
- Education: B.S.in biology at Washington & Lee University
- Occupation(s): Educator, author
- Spouse: Gloree Rohnke
- Children: Kurt; Kali; Matthew; Drew
- Parent(s): Radm. Oscar C. Rohnke and Gladys K. Rohnke

Karl Rohnke (1937-2020) is a key figure in the development of adventure education, and was instrumental in the creation of Project Adventure in the early 1970s.

== Biography ==
After graduating from Washington & Lee University in 1960, Rohnke was drafted into the U.S. Army. Afterwards he taught outdoor education programs in Southern California. After working for Outward Bound in Maine and North Carolina, Rohnke became one of the founders of Project Adventure in Hamilton, Massachusetts. He worked there until 1996, serving as director and president of the organization. Afterwards, Karl co-founded the High 5 Adventure Learning Center in Brattleboro, Vermont. In 1990 Rohnke received the Association for Experiential Education's Stratton Practitioner's Award.

== Bibliography ==
- Bag of Tricks newsletter, (1979–95)
- Cranking Out Adventure (1976)
- Cowstails and Cobras (1977)
- High Profile (1981)
- Silver Bullets (1984) ISBN 0-8403-5682-X [collection from Bag of Tricks]
- The Bottomless Bag (1988) ISBN 0-8403-6633-7 [collection from Bag of Tricks]
- The Bottomless Baggie (1991) ISBN 0-8403-6813-5 [collection from Bag of Tricks]
- Cowstails and Cobras II (1991) ISBN 0-8403-5434-7 (Winner of 1999 National Outdoor Book Award (Works of Significance))
- Slightly Skewed Vignettes (1992) ISBN 0-8403-7852-1
- Forget Me Knots (1993) ISBN 0-8403-7138-1
- The Bottomless Bag Again?! (1994) ISBN 0-8403-8757-1 [2nd edition of "Bottomless Bag", collection from Bag of Tricks]
- Quicksilver (1995) ISBN 0-7872-2103-1
- Funn Stuff v1-4 (1995-2000)
- Top Tricks (1997)
- On the Edge Games for Youth Ministry (1998)
- Back Pocket Adventure (1998) ISBN 0-536-01419-1
- 101 of the Best Corporate Team-Building Activities (2000) ISBN 1-932298-01-0
- A Small Book About Large Group Games (2002) ISBN 0-7872-9704-6
- The Complete Ropes Course Manual 3rd ed (2003) ISBN 0-7872-9309-1
- Funn 'n Games (2004) ISBN 0-7575-0846-4 [compilation of Funn Stuff 1-4]
- The Bottomless Bag Revival (2004) ISBN 0-7575-0878-2 [revamp of Bottomless Bag Again]
- Silver Bullets - The 25th Anniversary Edition (2009) ISBN 978-0-7575-6532-8 (2nd Edition)
