= HUMAK University of Applied Sciences =

University of applied sciences in Finland

Humak University of Applied Sciences
- Humanistinen ammattikorkeakoulu
- Motto: Ihmisiä yhdistävää osaamista
- Motto in English: Competence that connects
- Type: University of applied sciences (polytechnic)
- Principal: Jukka Määttä
- Students: 2800 (2025)
- Location: Helsinki, Jyväskylä, Kuopio, Turku and Tampere, Finland; 60.222015°N 24.901931°E
- Campus: Multiple sites
- Website: www.humak.fi

Humak University of Applied Sciences (Finnish: Humanistinen ammattikorkeakoulu, i.e. "Humanist"; Humak) is a university of applied sciences (a polytechnic) in Finland. Humak is a leading educator in the humanities, pedagogy, and cultural management in Finland.

Humak is a nationwide university of applied sciences, specialising in the development of expertise in organisational activities and youth work, work community development, adventure education, entrepreneurship in cultural management and creative industries, and language accessibility in the interpreting sector. Humak operates in four regions: Helsinki, Jyväskylä, Kuopio, Turku and Tampere.

Humak's strategical research, development, and innovation activities are especially focused in these areas: cultural management and conveyance of culture, youth work and communality, organisation work, work communities, and integration and interpreting and linguistic accessibility. Humak is the largest educator in Europe in the fields of NGO work and youth work.

== See also ==
- HAMK
- TAMK
