= Experiential education =

Philosophy of education

Experiential education is a philosophy of education that describes the process that occurs between a teacher and student that infuses direct experience with the learning environment and content. Sometimes, this could be as simple as a field trip, laboratory experiment, simulation, clinical study, or Socratic seminar.

The Association for Experiential Education regards experiential education as "a philosophy that informs many methodologies in which educators purposefully engage with learners in direct experience and focused reflection in order to increase knowledge, develop skills, clarify values, and develop people's capacity to contribute to their communities". The Journal of Experiential Education publishes peer-reviewed empirical and theoretical academic research within the field.

== Foundations ==
John Dewey was the most famous proponent of hands-on learning or experiential education, which was discussed in his book Experience and Education, published in 1938. It expressed his ideas about curriculum theory in the context of historical debates about school organization and the need to have experience as a fundamental aspect. Dewey's fame during that period rested on relentlessly critiquing public education and pointing out that the authoritarian, strict, pre-ordained knowledge approach of modern traditional education was too concerned with delivering knowledge, and not enough with understanding students' experiences.

Dewey advocated that education be based upon the quality of experience. For an experience to be educational, Dewey believed that certain parameters had to be met, the most important of which is that the experience has continuity and interaction. Continuity is the idea that the experience comes from and leads to other experiences, in essence propelling the person to learn more. Interaction is when the experience meets the internal needs or goals of a person. Dewey also categorizes experiences as possibly being mis-educative and non-educative. A mis-educative experience is one that stops or distorts growth for future experiences. A non-educative experience is one in which a person has not done any reflection and so has obtained nothing for mental growth that is lasting.

Dewey's work influenced dozens of other prominent experiential models and advocates in the later 20th century, including Foxfire, service learning, Kurt Hahn and Outward Bound, and Paulo Freire, who is often cited in works on experiential education. Friere focused on participation by students in experience and radical democracy, and the creation of praxis among learners.

== Development in Asian countries ==
Experiential methods in education have existed in China for over two thousand years, since the time Confucius began promoting the educational style. John Dewey was in China in the early 1900s and his ideas were extremely popular.

Established in 1973, Breakthrough in Hong Kong was the first non-profit organization that applied the concepts of experiential education (though primarily conceptualized in terms of outdoor adventure education) in youth works. Since then, development in experiential education has proceeded in Singapore, Taiwan, Macau, and some large cities in China.

Experiential education started in Qatar in 2010 through AL-Bairaq, which is an outreach, non-traditional educational program that targets high school students and focuses on a curriculum based on STEM fields. The idea behind AL-Bairaq is to offer high school students the opportunity to connect with the research environment in the Center for Advanced Materials (CAM) at Qatar University. Faculty members train and mentor the students and help develop and enhance their critical thinking, problem-solving, and teamwork skills, using a hands-on-activities approach.

Starting in the twenty-teens, experiential education organizations in Asia begin gaining accreditation by the Association for Experiential Education, which had historically primarily served a North American audience. Outward Bound Hong Kong was accredited in 2011, followed by Chadwick International in Korea in 2019 and the Hanifl Centre in 2020.

== Change in roles and structures ==
In addition to the notions raised by Dewey, recent research has shown that experiential learning does not replace traditional methods of learning but supplements it to offer additional skills, perspectives, and understanding of relationships. Students participating in authentic activities can experience real consequences as they are meeting learning objectives. The experiential approach aligns with Armstrong's claims that students, rather than teachers, should be responsible for their learning. Proponents claim that an experiential education mindset can change the way teachers and students view knowledge as learning becomes active and transacted within life or lifelike situations. Experiential education can also link traditional scholarly priorities (e.g. formal knowledge production) with improvement of professional practice.

Whether teachers employ experiential education in the form of laboratory and clinical learning, cultural journalism, service learning, environmental education, the approach involves engaging students in active roles for the purpose of learning. Experiential education can involve various tools like field work, policy and civic activity, and entrepreneurship outside of the classroom along with games, simulations, and role plays. In these activities, students may establish group goals, practice decision-making skills, and develop leadership skills, which can also enhance student motivation and confidence. According to Ernie Stringer, "Action learners move through continuous cycles of this inquiry process to improve their understanding, extend their knowledge, or refine their skills."

Besides changing student roles, experiential education requires a change in the role of teachers. The approach requires teachers to position themselves as facilitators of experiences and learning that may take students outside of the classroom. Because action precedes attempts to synthesize knowledge, teachers generally cannot plan or implement a curriculum unit as a neat, predictable package. Yet, a well-planned curriculum is still necessary to ensure experiential learning results in meaningful student learning. Teachers may become active learners, too, experimenting with their students, reflecting upon the learning activities they have designed, and responding to their students' reactions to the activities. With less dependence on prescribed curriculum, teachers may come to view themselves as more than just recipients of external curriculum decisions.

As students and teachers take on more active roles, the traditional organizational structures of the school need adjustment. For example, at the Challenger Middle School in Colorado Springs, Colorado, service activities are an integral part of the academic program. Accommodating service learning requires large time blocks that necessitate specialized scheduling. At the University Heights Alternative School in the Bronx, the Project Adventure experiential learning program has led the faculty to adopt an all-day time block as an alternative to the traditional 45-minute periods. The faculty now organizes the curriculum by project instead of by separate disciplines.

== Practice ==
The methodologies reflected in experiential education have evolved since the time of Hahn and Dewey. For experiential education to be an effective pedagogy, physical experience must be combined with reflection. Adding reflective practice allows for consolidation of key learnings. Further, for the efficacy of experiential education, the learner must be given sufficient time to process the information.

Experiential education informs many educational practices in schools (formal education) and out-of-school (informal education) programs. Many teaching methods rely on experiential education to provide context and frameworks for learning through action and reflection while others at higher levels (university and professional education) focus on field skills and modeling. Examples of specific methods are outlined below.

- Outdoor education uses organized learning activities that occur in the outdoors, and uses environmental experiences as a learning tool.
- Adventure education may use the philosophy of experiential education in developing team and group skills in both students and adults. Initially, groups work to solve problems. For example, in a ropes course designed to build the teamwork skills, a faculty or student team might work together to get the entire group over a 12-foot wall or through an intricate web of rope. After each challenge, the group debriefs how it functioned as a team and how the insights gained from the experience transfers to other environments.
- Service learning is a combination of community service with stated learning goals, relying on experience as the foundation for meaning. Students provide meaningful service while simultaneously gaining new skills, knowledge and understanding as an integrated aspect of an academic program.
- Active learning, a term popular in US education circles in the 1980s, encourages learners to take responsibility for their learning, requiring their experience in education to inform their process of learning.
- Environmental education is based in educating learners about relationships within the natural environment and how those relationships are interdependent. Students participate in outdoor activities as part of their learning experience.
- Vocational education involves training for an occupation.
- Sandwich degrees involve a year working in industry during academic study.

== Examples ==
Centers in the United Stares offering experiential education include Presidential Classroom, Ashokan Center, Global College, the New England Literature Program at the University of Michigan, the Chicago Center for Urban Life and Culture, GoBeyond Student Travel, and the Boys & Girls Clubs of America.

Several Australian high schools have established experiential education programmes, including Caulfield Grammar School's five-week internationalism programs in Nanjing, China and Geelong Grammar School's Timbertop outdoor education program.

At the professional school level, experiential education is often integrated into a curriculum in "clinical" courses following the medical school model of "See one, Do one, Teach one", in which students learn by practicing medicine. This approach is being introduced in other professions, such as law school clinics, in which skills are directly worked into courses to teach every concept. These concepts include interviewing, listening skills, negotiation, contract writing and advocacy.

== Methods ==
There are multiple ways in which experiential education is practiced. Examples of experiential learning methods used include:

- Active-based learning – All participants in the group must engage actively in working together toward the stated objectives.
- Cooperative learning - students work on tasks in interdependent groupings.
- Place-based learning – The process of using local community and environment as a starting point to teach concepts in language arts, mathematics, social studies, science, and other subjects across the curriculum.
- Problem-based learning – Provides a structure for discovery that helps students internalize learning and leads to greater comprehension.
- Project-based learning – An instructional method that uses projects as the central focus of instruction in a variety of disciplines.
- Simulation-based learning – A combination of active, problem, project, and place-based learning; Participants are placed in a simulated environment and given objectives requiring constant attention and care.
- Experience Builders connect work to learning by helping students gain real-world work experience and experiential knowledge within a mentored project-based learning environment.
