= Adventure park =

Park with recreational activities

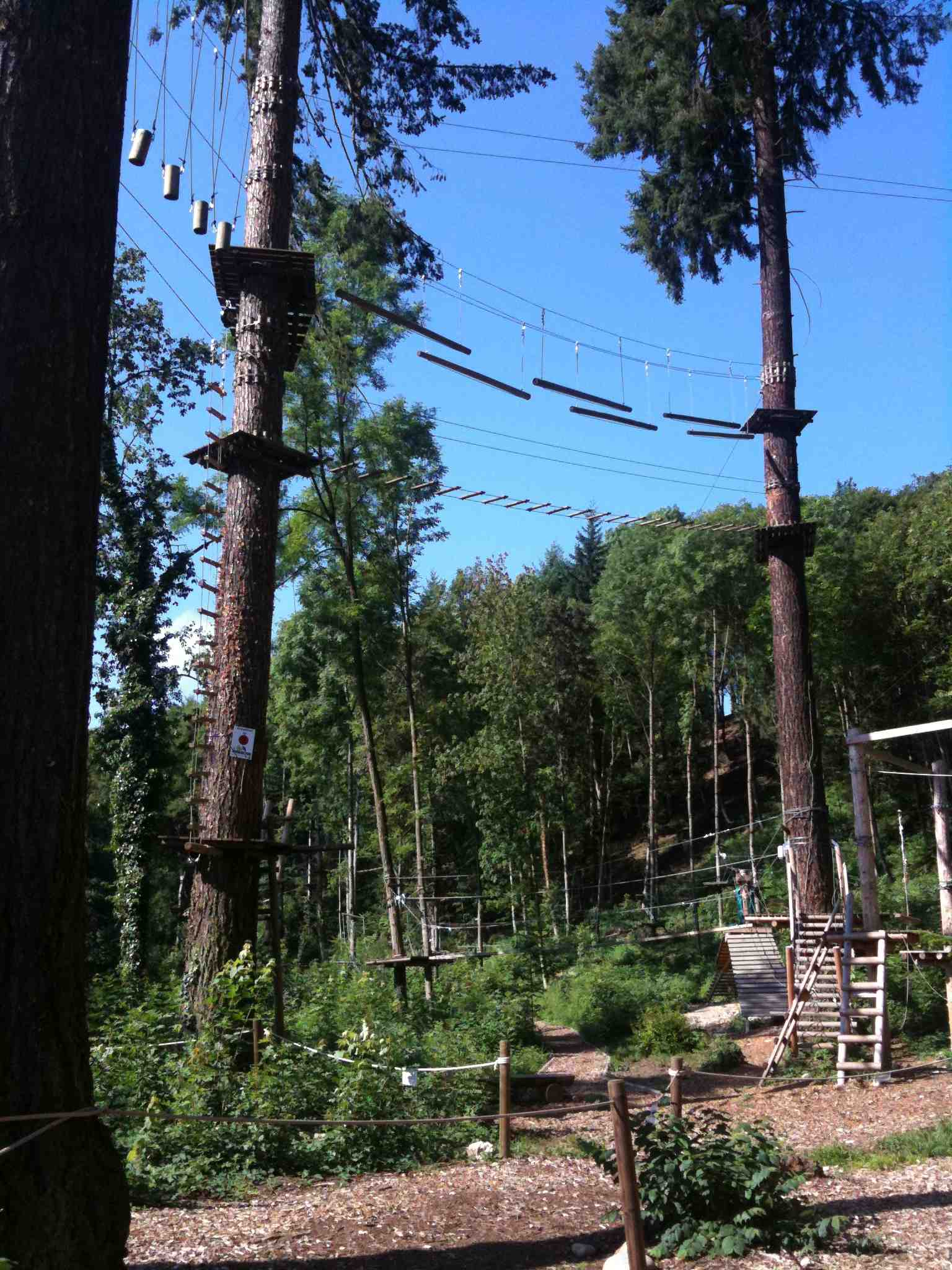
Forest Aerial Adventure Park

An adventure park is a place which can contain a wide variety of elements, including but not limited to, rope climbing exercises, obstacle courses, bouldering, rock climbing, target oriented activities, and zip-lines. They are usually intended for recreation.

== Related outdoor activities ==
A ropes course can be considered a challenging outdoor personal development and team-building activity. Some parks offer both – a recreational section and a team building section.

A canopy tour is a specific type of ziplining where a person is harnessed to a steel cable and propelled by gravity from platform to platform high up in the trees of a thick forest canopy. Although these have previously been used for civil and even scientific uses, it has since become a popular activity for the recreation and tourism industries.

== Safety systems ==
The safety equipment for each participant consists of a harness, a lanyard and a belay device. Helmets or gloves can also be used.

== Gallery ==
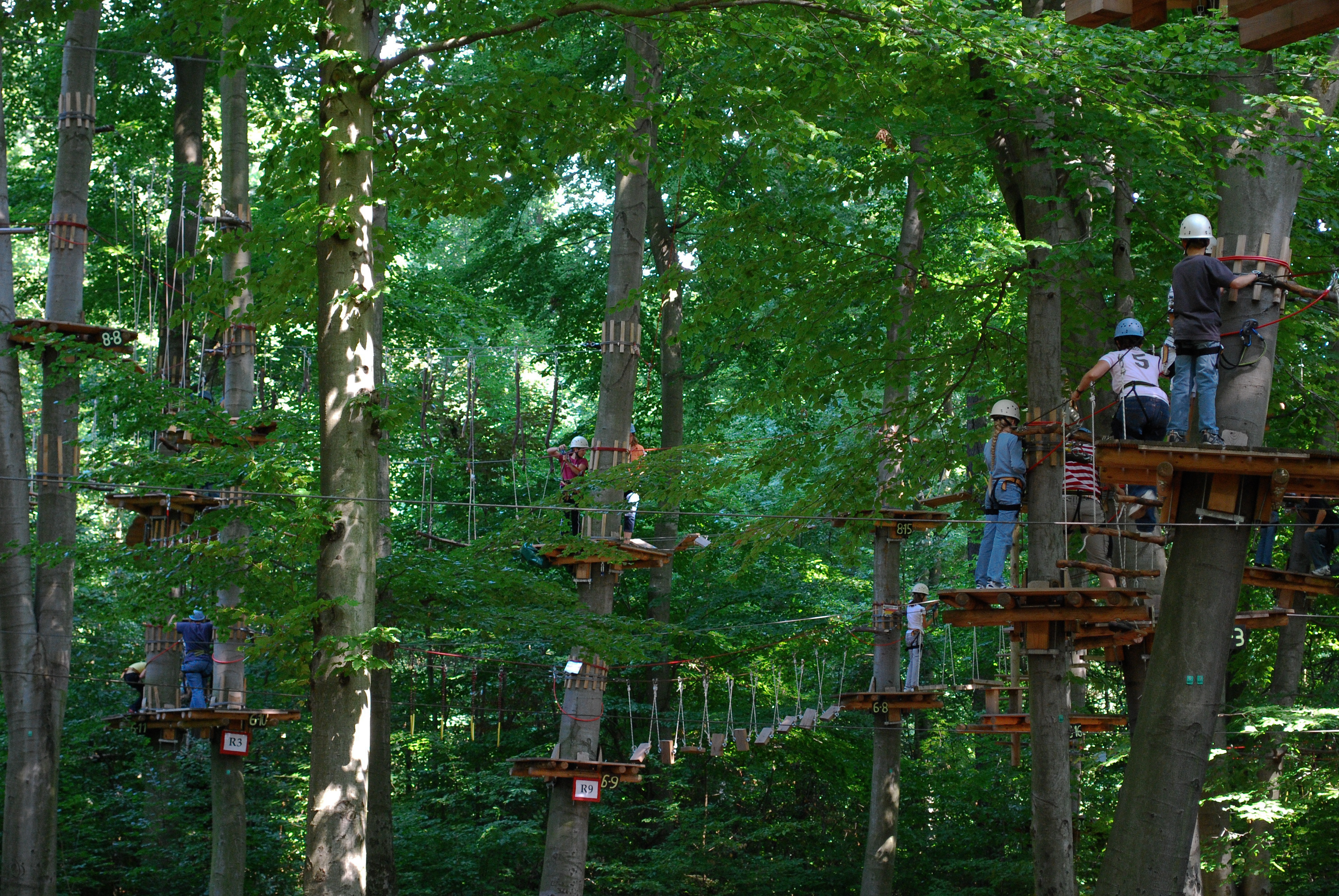
Forest adventure park

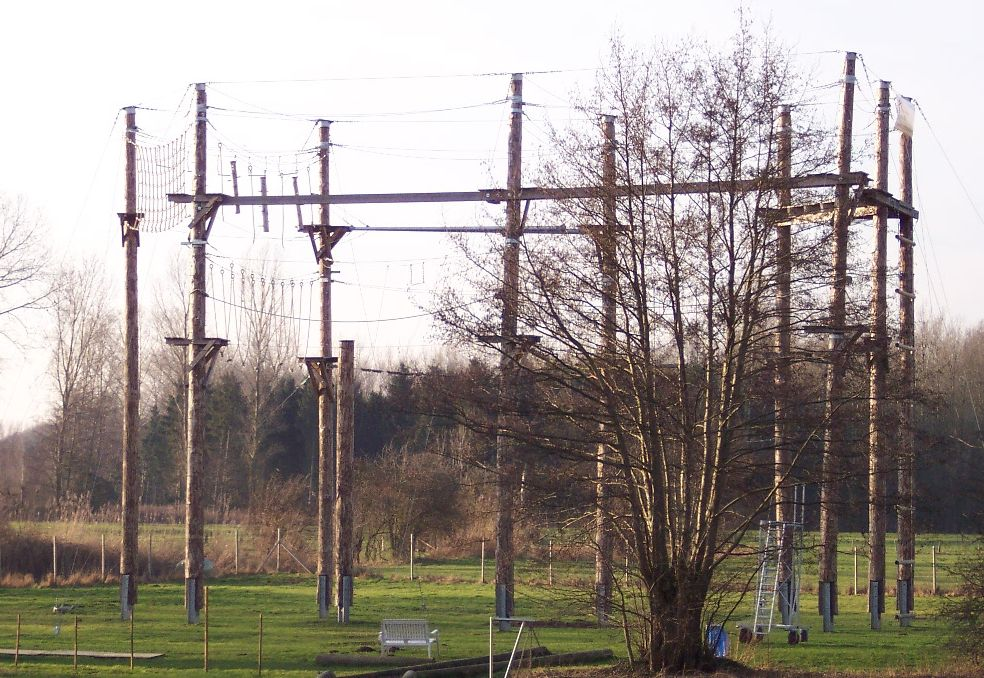
Adventure park on Poles

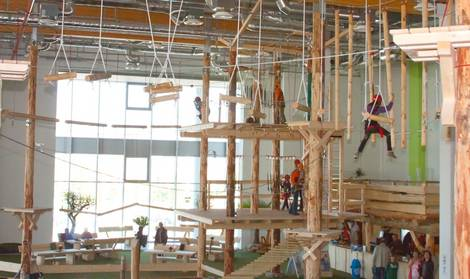
Indoor Adventure park in a shopping mall

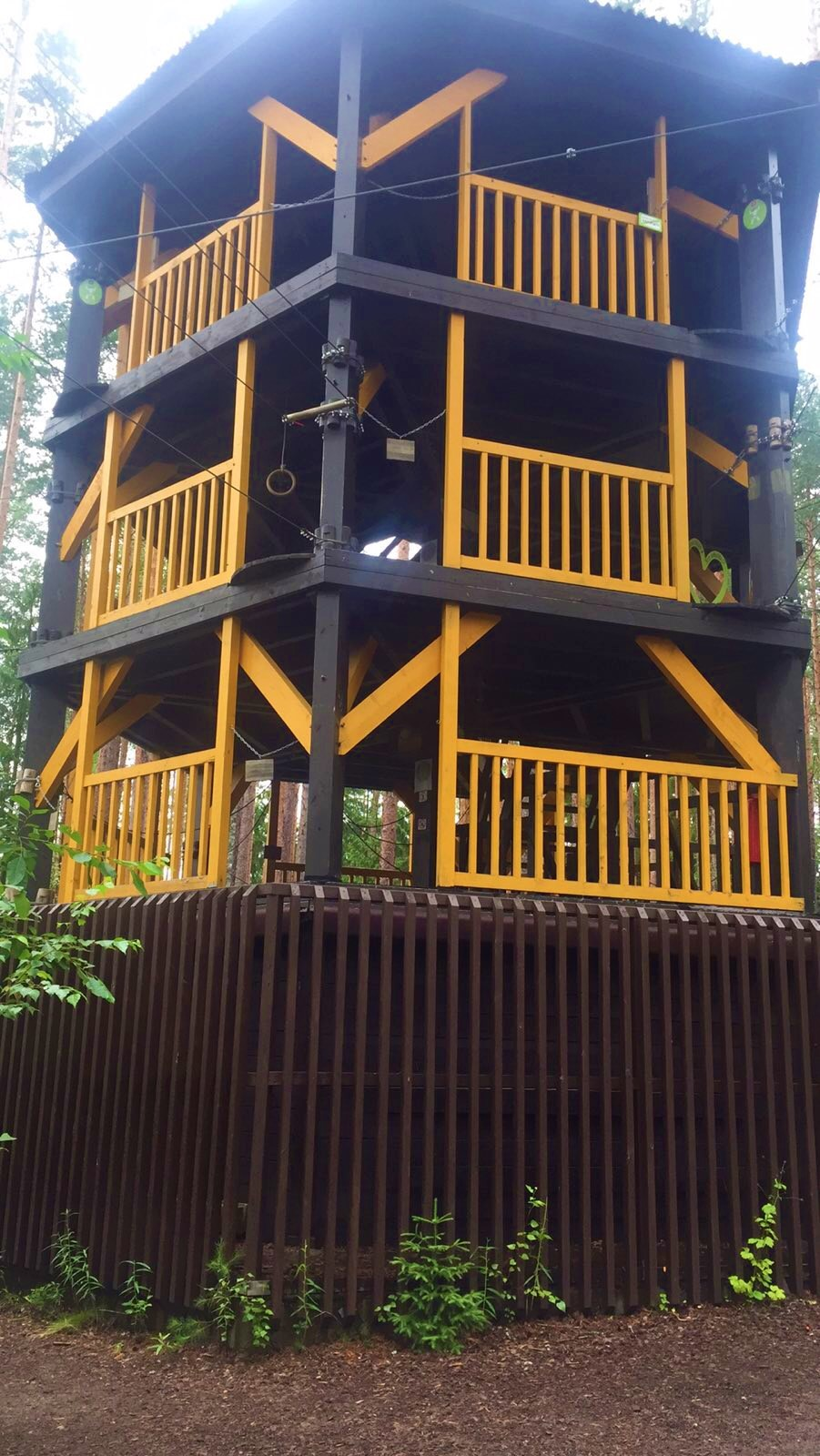
Rope park in the Leningrad region, Russia. Starting tower

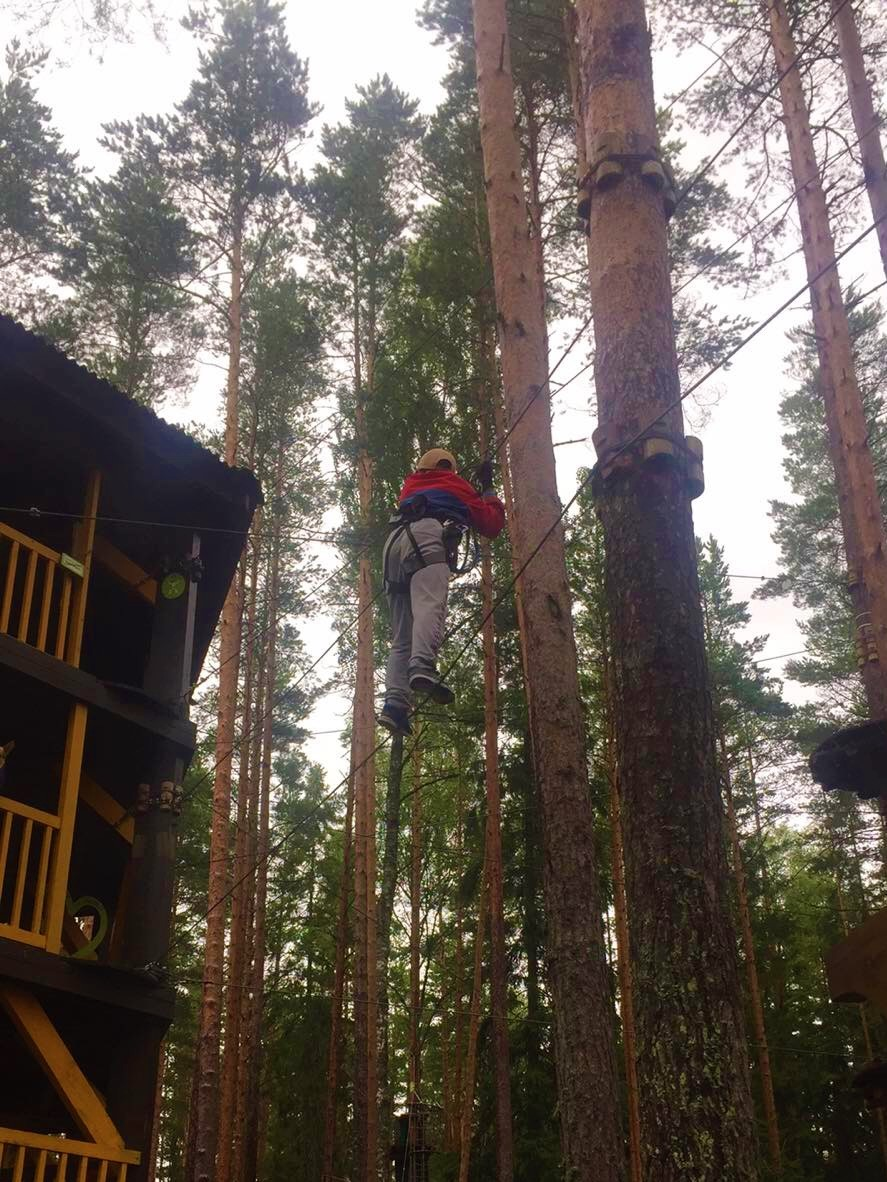
Park visitor on stage. Leningrad region, Russia

== See also ==
- Ropes course
- Zip-line
- Via ferrata
