= Adventure education =

Education style

Adventure education is the promotion of learning through adventure centered experiences.

Adventure centered experiences can include a wide variety of activities, due to the different ways people experience adventure. Outdoor sports, challenge courses, races, and even indoor activities can be used in adventure education. Adventure education relates to adventure programming, adventure therapy, and outdoor education. It is an active process rather than a passive process of learning that requires active engagement from the learners as well as the instructors. Often adventure education is linked to incorporating all five senses within the experiences which can heighten the opportunities for learning and retaining information. The learning experiences within adventure education programs are structured for a potential increase in human performance and capacity. Sometimes the adventure lies more in the journey than the destination. The venture lies in the struggle, not in the prize.

== Definition of adventure ==
Merriam-Webster defines adventure as "an undertaking usually involving danger and unknown risks". Danger is defined as "exposure or liability to injury, pain, harm, or loss." Danger involves two factors: perils (the origins of injury or the causes of loss) and hazards (the conditions that emphasize the chance of injury or loss). Risk is defined as "potential loss or injury". Risk can be described as "real risk" or "perceived risk" such as bungee jumping; it seems as though there is a high level of risk, but with proper equipment it can be relatively safe. Danger, then is the exposure, or magnitude, of the harm a person may encounter; risk is the probability of that harm. These two variables are filtered through a person's perceptions, which may be inaccurate.

== Outcomes of adventure education programming ==
Adventure education has many positive outcomes. A meta-analysis of adventure education studies identified forty major outcomes, grouped into the following six categories: leadership, self-concept, academic, personality, interpersonal, and adventuresomeness. Adventure education often employs practical skills that will benefit an individual in areas beyond the activities in an adventure program. There are three theories of transfer in adventure education in which the participant may apply what they learned into future experiences. The first of these theories is "specific transfer" – the learner applies the habits and skills learned during an experience to a new and similar experience (e.g. when an individual learns how to belay during a rock climbing experience and then applies that knowledge to rappelling). The second theory is "nonspecific transfer" – the learner establishes some common principles acquired through previous experiences and applies them in a new learning situation (e.g. when an individual develops trust through a trust building activity). The third theory is "metaphoric transfer" – the learner applies similar underlying principles to other areas and situations (e.g. when individuals utilize teamwork during an activity such as canoeing and later applies it to the workplace or other group experiences).

== Program characteristics that contribute to program outcomes ==
There are six categories of program characteristics that contribute to achieving the program outcomes described above. These are the physical environment, activities, processing, the group, instructors, and the participant.

=== Physical environment ===
Unfamiliar environments contribute a great deal to program outcomes experienced by adventure education participants. Being in a new environment allows participants to gain new perspectives on familiar environments and gives them the freedom to experiment. An unfamiliar environment also creates some level of anxiety for the participant, as well as creating the perception of risk. Overcoming the challenges presented by unfamiliar environments through the mastery of specific tasks results in positive benefits to the individual, such as increased self-esteem. Positive outcomes are offered by several types of environments, including wilderness, non-wilderness (e.g. ropes-course), or a traditional classroom. However, wilderness is often considered as providing additional benefits to participants, thus being the optimal environmental setting for adventure education programs.

=== Activities ===
Rather than activities themselves, it is the qualities of activities that are responsible for achieving program outcomes. The combination of challenge, mastery, and success in activities is what led to participant growth. Challenges should be holistic in order to maximize positive outcomes. Programs should include mental, emotional, and physical challenges, and encourage concurrent mastery in all three domains. Challenges should also increase incrementally, so as not to overwhelm participants early on in the program but allow them to grow and develop throughout. Activities should be well organized and matched to suit the particular needs and requirements of the participants. The GRABBS model (Goals, Readiness, Affect, Behavior, Body, and Stage of Development) is a good method for matching activities and participants. Success in the activities must be achievable. However, some failure may also be good for participant development. Program participants can learn from their failures to achieve success. Goal-setting is critical to achieving program outcomes, at both the individual and group levels. It is also important to allow participants to have personal choice related to activities. The "challenge-by-choice" philosophy of adventure programming allows the participant to have some autonomy related to the activities s/he participates in.

While the qualities of activities are most important in achieving program outcomes, there are also specific activities that are well-suited to adventure programming. These include activities related to trust and empathy (e.g. trust falls), communication, decision-making and problem solving, social responsibility, and personal responsibility.

=== Processing ===
Processing is defined as "the sorting and ordering of information" that enables program participants to internalize meaning gained from an adventure education experience Three models have been identified by which participants process meaning. In the "Mountains Speak for Themselves" model, participants are responsible for reflecting on their experiences on their own, without facilitation from the instructor. In the "Outward Bound Plus" model, the instructor serves as a counselor, facilitator, and discussion leader. In the metaphoric model, activities are consciously framed so that they become experiential metaphors that can be applied to challenges in participants' daily lives.

=== The group ===
Several characteristics of the group also contribute to achieving program outcomes. In terms of the size of the group, small groups of seven to fifteen individuals are usually more conducive to achieving desired outcomes. Reciprocity within the group is also important. This refers to group members learning to cooperate with one another and capitalize on the strengths of each individual. Autonomy of individuals and personal relationships are other aspects of the group that contribute to achievement.

=== Instructors ===
Certain aspects of program instructors such as biographical characteristics, personality, and interpersonal interactions can have a large influence on participants' achievement of desired program outcomes. Instructors may be required to have a bachelor's degree in Outdoor Leadership to instruct at most Universities and community colleges. Instructors may also be required to hold certain certifications in Wilderness First Responder , American Mountain Guides Single Pitch Instructor and American Canoe Association Whitewater Instructor Certification, among many others.

=== The participant ===
The age, gender, background, and expectations of program participants have also been shown to be related to the achievement of program outcomes. Depending on the program a student is in, the program may require the student to be autonomous during expeditionary courses. Student autonomy can be beneficial to students by enhancing personal growth, an increase in self-reliance, and enhancing the overall group experience. However, student autonomy is considered to be controversial in regards to outdoor adventure educational programs, due to risk management concerns. Yet, it is recommended that the instructors of these types of programs must fully understand the risks of student autonomy prior to implementing them as part of an adventure education program.

== Applications ==
Adventure education programming can be implemented in several contexts, including therapy for youth at risk, survivors of sexual assault, families in distress, persons with medical conditions, and Veteran assimilation back to civilian life

== Universities offering degrees in Adventure Education ==
Many vocational institutes offer training and courses in adventure education. There exists also universities offering degree programs in adventure and outdoor education:

Canada: Thompson Rivers University in Kamloops offers two four-year bachelor's degrees with concentrations in adventure studies, a Bachelor of Tourism Management and Bachelor of Interdisciplinary Studies, as well as certificate and diploma programs in adventure studies and heli-skiing.

Finland: Humak University of Applied Sciences is offering a 210 ECTS bachelor's degree programme in Adventure and Outdoor Education (Community Educator, Bachelor of Humanities).

New Zealand: Auckland University of Technology is offering a bachelor's degree in Sport and Recreation - Outdoor Education.

United Kingdom: The University of Chichester has been running its adventure education degree since the year 2000.

United States: Plymouth State University in Plymouth, New Hampshire offers a Bachelors of Science in Adventure Education.

United States: Oregon State University in Corvallis and Bend, Oregon offers a Bachelor of Science in Tourism Recreation and Adventure Leadership.

== See also ==
- Environmental education
- Experiential education
- Outdoor education
- Outward Bound
