= Outward Bound (disambiguation) =

Outward Bound is an international network of non-profit organizations which runs adventure and wilderness education programs.

Outward Bound may also refer to:

== Licensed Outward Bound Schools ==
- Outward Bound Australia
- Outward Bound Costa Rica
- Outward Bound Hong Kong
- Outward Bound New Zealand
- Outward Bound Singapore
- Outward Bound USA

== Other ==
- Outward Bound (play), a hit 1923 play by Sutton Vane
- Outward Bound (film), a 1930 film adaptation of the play
- Outward Bound, a 1964 novel by Norman Spinrad
- Outward Bound (Eric Dolphy album), 1960
- Outward Bound (Sonny Landreth album), 1992
- Outward Bound, a 1966 album by Tom Paxton
- Outward Bound, a 1999 novel by James P. Hogan
- Outward bound, a nautical term for a ship leaving a port and heading to the open sea
- The Outward Bound (painting), a 1912 painting by Frederick Cayley Robinson, depicting RMS Titanic

== See also ==
- Outbound (disambiguation)
- Outdoor education
- Experiential education
- Experiential learning
