= National Outdoor Leadership School =

Non-profit outdoor education school

- The official NOLS logo
- Abbreviation: NOLS
- Formation: June 8, 1965; 61 years ago
- Founder: Paul Petzoldt
- Type: Nonprofit
- Headquarters: Lander, Wyoming
- Region served: Worldwide
- Services: Wilderness expeditions Wilderness Medicine
- Fields: Outdoor education
- President: Sandy Colhoun
- Website: www.nols.edu

NOLS is a non-profit outdoor education school based in the United States teaching environmental ethics, technical outdoor skills, wilderness medicine, risk management and judgment, and leadership on extended wilderness expeditions and in traditional classrooms. It was previously known as the National Outdoor Leadership School, but was renamed NOLS in 2015. NOLS teaches wilderness skills and leadership relating to the environment. NOLS runs courses on six continents.

Courses cover leadership and technical outdoor skills, including backpacking, canoeing, whitewater kayaking, packrafting, caving, rock climbing, fly fishing, horse-packing, sea kayaking, mountaineering, rafting, sailing, skiing, snowboarding, and wilderness medicine. NOLS has trained more than 280,000 students. Academic credit is available for all courses, through either the University of Utah, Western State Colorado University, or Central Wyoming College. NOLS has direct credit agreements with many colleges and universities. The company's headquarters are in Lander, Wyoming.

== History ==
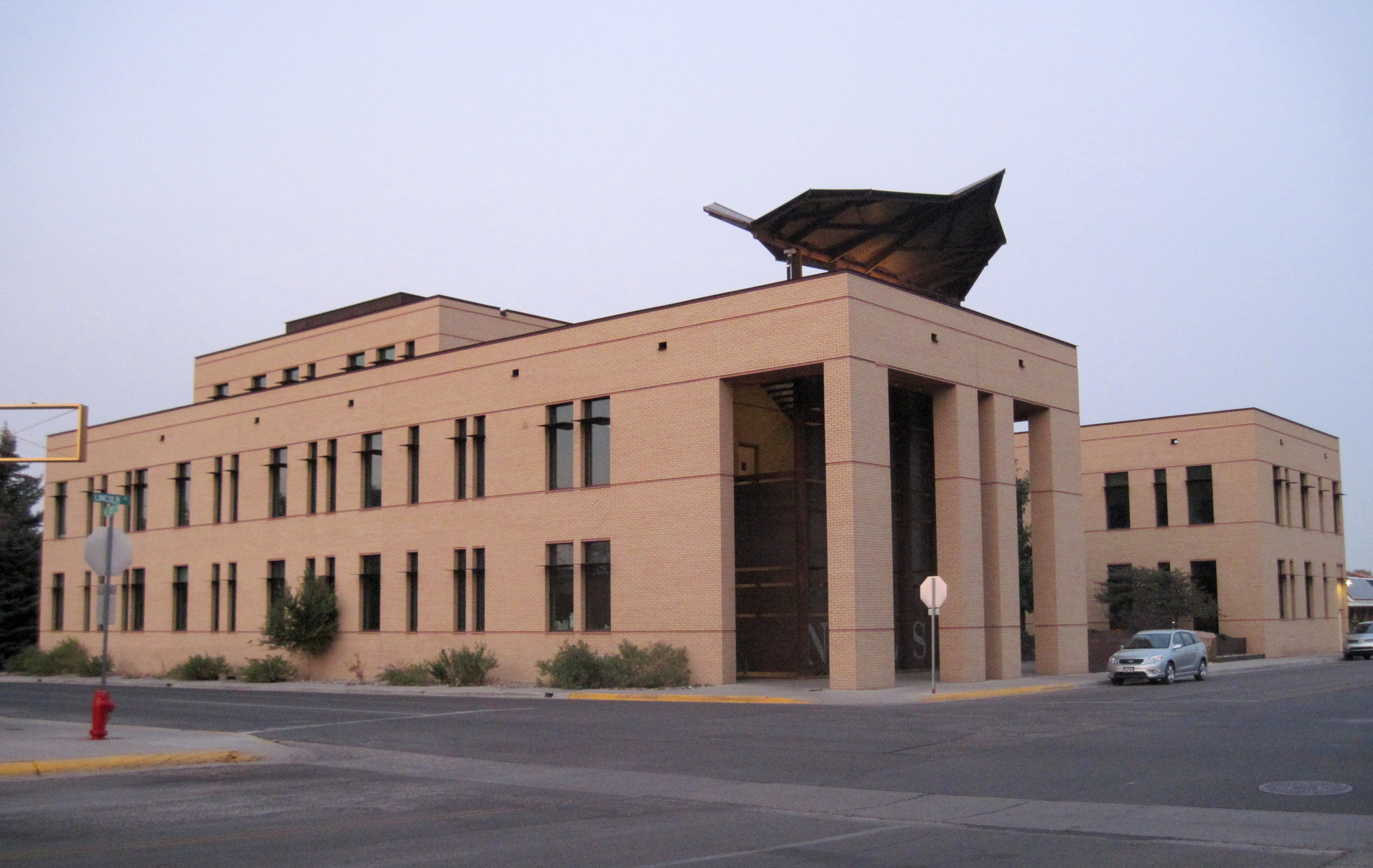
NOLS Headquarters, Lander, Wyoming

=== Early years ===
NOLS was set up in 1965 by Paul Petzoldt, a mountaineer and a member of the United States Army's 10th Mountain Division, with the backing of three Lander residents (Ed Breece, legislator and Petzoldt's brother-in-law; Jack Nicholas, legislator; and William Erickson, physician). Breece, Nicholas, and Ericson formed the nucleus of the early board of trustees. Petzoldt was an early Outward Bound instructor, and wanted to establish a school of outdoor leadership skills.

The first facility opened in 1965 in Lander, Wyoming at Sinks Canyon. June 8, 1965 marks the date of the founding and the first trip beginning at the trailhead of Hidden Valley Ranch where 100 male students went into the Wind River Range. In the beginning, NOLS struggled with finances to provide necessities for outdoor trips, so Petzoldt and his early team developed the “uniform” made of Salvation Army donations. The school began to grow in the early years and in 1966, women were allowed to enroll. In 1967, the adventure courses began for young boys aged 13–15.

In 1971, the administrative offices were moved to downtown Lander, Wyoming, where NOLS is still based today. NOLS has facilities in Alaska, Washington, Arizona, Utah, New York, Idaho, Chile, Mexico, Canada, New Zealand, the Yukon Territory, Tanzania, Scandinavia, and India. It also runs wilderness medicine courses in a variety of other locations around the world.

=== "30 Days to Survival" ===
NOLS grew during the 1970s, due to the publicity gained by an appearance on NBC's Alcoa Hour. The episode, titled "30 Days to Survival," followed a NOLS course as through the Wind River Range. As a result of the airing, the school's enrollment grew from 250 students in 1969 to over 750 in 1970. The school also gained publicity in December 1969 from the Life magazine article, “Last Mountain Man? Not If He Can Help It," which featured the school and Paul Petzoldt. The school's growth continued; by the end of 1976, NOLS had 40 instructors and from 1976 to 1977, had enrolled 1,523 students.

=== 1980s to today ===
NOLS partnered with the University of Utah to offer college credit for courses, and helped create the U.S. Leave No Trace program. In 1989, NOLS adopted an outcome-based education model. In 1999, NOLS acquired the Wilderness Medicine Institute. NOLS also began to offer professional training to corporate and institutional clients, including NASA.

In the summer of 2013, NOLS designed, developed, and led Expedition Denali, the first team of African Americans to attempt to summit Denali (Mount McKinley), the United States’ highest peak at 20,320 feet. The summit attempt was not successful due to weather conditions, but the outreach work that NOLS and Expedition Denali members did before and after the expedition expanded the awareness of organizations and individuals about people of color engaging in the outdoors and in providing youth of color with role models to pursue their own outdoor interests. A film, An American Ascent, was made throughout the expedition and has been shown in film festivals and schools around the country as well as the White House on July 3, 2015. Author James Edward Mills wrote The Adventure Gap, a book chronicling the expedition as well as the history of African Americans in the outdoors in the United States.

NOLS is committed to diversity in the traditionally white-male dominated field of outdoor adventure education. As of 2021, NOLS offers expeditions for People of Color, those who identify as LGBTQ+, and women.

== Curriculum ==
=== Leave No Trace National Program ===
The Leave No Trace National Program began in the 1960s as the USDA Forest Service looked for ways to help people take care of the public lands they were visiting in increasing numbers. In the early 1990s NOLS partnered with the Forest Service on the program. 1994 marks the founding of the Leave No Trace Center for Outdoor Ethics, a non-profit organization.

The principles of Leave No Trace concern minimizing the social and environmental impacts that have led to ecological degradation. The program serves as an education tool to provide guidance for how to behave while camping in the backcountry. The seven principles are:

1. Plan ahead and prepare.
2. Travel and camp on durable surfaces.
3. Dispose of waste properly.
4. Leave what you find.
5. Minimize campfire impacts.
6. Respect wildlife.
7. Be considerate of other visitors.

=== NOLS Wilderness Medicine ===
Set up by Melissa Gray and Buck Tilton in Pitkin, Colorado in 1990 as a western branch of Stonehearth Outdoor Learning Opportunities (SOLO), the Wilderness Medicine Institute (WMI) was purchased by NOLS in 1999. It is now known as NOLS Wilderness Medicine.

The school maintained its headquarters in Pitkin, Colorado, until the summer of 2002, at which point the offices and administrative staff moved to Lander, WY, and into the newly finished NOLS international headquarters. In January 2007, WMI entered into a partnership with Landmark Learning of Cullowhee, NC in order to provide wilderness medicine courses in the American southeast. Then, in 2010 WMI entered into a partnership with REI Co-op to offer wilderness medicine courses through the REI Outdoor School (now REI Experiences).

=== Outdoor skills ===
Skills taught on NOLS courses include backpacking, canoeing, caving, climbing, fly-fishing, horsepacking, mountaineering, rafting, river kayaking, sailing, sea kayaking, skiing, snowboarding, etc. Students are taught about equipment, feeding themselves in the outdoors, and hygiene. Leave No Trace principles show students how to travel in the outdoors with minimum impact.

=== Environmental studies ===
Throughout the courses students learn about Leave No Trace principles and practice them. Students gain insight into the history of their location by reading about and discussing the plants, animals, geology, etc. of their surroundings. Students delve into the environmental issues around the area and humans' environmental ethics regarding the topics.

=== Risk management ===
Risk management is a part of the curriculum and plays a large role in how the school approaches new course areas and course types. In the field, risk management revolves around self-care, preventing injury, and handling risky situations. Students learn about proper foot care and body temperature regulation. Judgment and group decision making is taught through experience leading daily travel and through targeted classes. Emergency procedures are put into place and taught to all students in case a student or staff member is injured or lost.

NOLS, with Outward Bound USA and the Student Conservation Association, sponsors the Wilderness Risk Management Conference.

=== Hazards ===
Encountering bears is a concern in the Wind River Range. There are other concerns as well, including insects, wildfires, adverse snow conditions and nighttime cold temperatures.

There have been incidents, including deaths, due to falls from steep cliffs (a misstep could be fatal in this class 4/5 terrain) and due to falling rocks, over the years, including 1993, 2007 (involving an experienced NOLS leader), 2015 and 2018. Other incidents include an injured backpacker being airlifted near SquareTop Mountain in 2005, and a death from a fall in 2006 that involved state search and rescue. There also was an additional presumed death in 1999, where the student's body was never recovered.

== NOLS and other organizations ==
=== NSHSS and NOLS ===
The National Society of High School Scholars and NOLS team together to encourage members of NSHSS to pursue leadership development.

=== University of Utah and NOLS ===
NOLS partners with the University of Utah's department of Parks, Recreation, and Tourism in order for NOLS students to receive college credit through the University of Utah on NOLS courses.

== Notable alumni ==
- Pete Athans, aka Mr. Everest
- David Breashears, mountaineer and filmmaker
- Jimmy Chin, American professional climber, mountaineer, skier, photographer, and film director
- Thinlas Chorol, social entrepreneur, founder of the Ladakhi Women's Travel Company and Indian women's rights advocate
- Anderson Cooper, CNN anchor
- Chris Cox, computer scientist and the former chief product officer (CPO) at Facebook
- Kit Deslauriers, first person to ski down the Seven Summits
- Michael Dwyer, architect and author.
- Scott Fischer, mountaineer and mountain guide
- Pam Flowers, American adventurer, speaker and author who has led sled-dog expeditions to the Arctic.
- Dede Gardner, producer
- Zach Gilford, star of Friday Night Lights on NBC
- Chip Giller, founder of Grist Magazine
- Allison Janney, actor
- Harshvardhan Joshi, mountaineer, founder of Sangharsh Mission Mount Everest
- Sebastian Junger, author of The Perfect Storm
- Scott Kelly, American astronaut and engineer
- John F. Kennedy Jr., politician
- William Harjo LoneFight, Native American author, entrepreneur and social critic
- Andrew McCarthy, actor and author
- Leland Melvin, astronaut, professional football player
- Peter Metcalf, founder and CEO of Black Diamond Equipment
- James Edward Mills, freelance journalist/independent media producer
- Denise Mitten, executive director of Woodswomen, Inc.
- David Morrell, author of First Blood, the novel in which Rambo was created
- Candice Olson, co-founder of iVillage
- Marc Randolph, co-founder of Netflix
- Maggie Rogers, American musician and singer-songwriter
- Tom Scott (businessman), co-founder of Nantucket Nectars
- Kristen Wiig, actor

== See also ==
- Tori Murden, NOLS Board Chair, first woman to row solo across the Atlantic Ocean and ski to the geographic South Pole
