= Outward Bound Costa Rica =

Location
- San José, Costa Rica
- Coordinates: 9.94°N 83.97°W

Information
- Type: Experiential School
- Established: September 1991
- Founder: Bradley James Rowe, Ph.D.
- Status: Open
- Authorizer: Outward Bound International
- President: Bradley James Rowe, Ph.D.
- Staff: 20 - 30
- Age range: 13+
- Enrollment: 4,787 (2013)
- Classes: 41 in 2012
- Student to teacher ratio: 4:1
- Language: English and Spanish through adventure-based wilderness experiences.
- Website: outwardboundcostarica.org

Outward Bound Costa Rica (OBCR) (formerly known as "Costa Rica Rainforest Outward Bound School" or CRROBS) is a non-profit experiential learning and outdoor education organization based in San José, Costa Rica. It is a charter of Outward Bound International (OBI).

== Mission and philosophy ==
Learning through experience was the philosophy of the original Outward Bound when it was founded in 1941. It is an educational process based on action and reflection. Experiences are intentionally designed, presented, and reflected upon to instill values and promote skills. The mission of OBCR is to promote personal, cultural, and environmental integrity through Outward Bound principle-based adventure. Staff undertake diversity training to help deliver this.

The Costa Rica charter combines adventure activities - including hiking, rafting, kayaking, surfing, rappelling, SCUBA diving and tree climbing - with the cultural experience of learning first-hand about the Costa Rican way of life and environment by staying with local families and immersion in wilderness settings. The organization's aim is to develop 12 character traits:

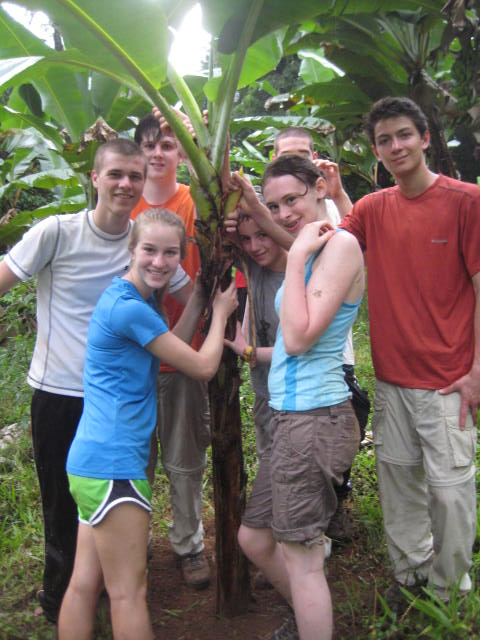
Walnut Hills course plants a banana tree

- Active curiosity
- Tenacity & Pursuit
- Undefeatable spirit
- Sensible self-denial
- Compassion
- Sense of community & holism
- Physical fitness
- Dynamic leadership
- Open & effective communication
- Inter-cultural understanding
- Knowledge & respect for the natural environment
- Self-respect

== Core principles ==
The organization claims that five core principles are central to every Outward Bound course:

- Challenge & Adventure
- Compassion & Service
- Social & Environmental Responsibility
- Character Development
- Learning Through Experience

== History ==
The first Outward Bound school was opened in Aberdyfi, Wales in 1941 by Kurt Hahn and Lawrence Holt with the support of the Blue Funnel Line. Outward Bound grew out of Hahn's work in the development of the Gordonstoun school and what is now known as the Duke of Edinburgh's Award. Outward Bound's founding mission was to give young seamen the ability to survive harsh conditions at sea by teaching confidence and tenacity. Jim Hogan served as warden for the first year of the school.

Fifty years later, in September 1991, a Coloradoan named Jim Rowe traveled by land from home - where he had been working as an instructor for Colorado Outward Bound School (COBS) - to Costa Rica. The first year in Costa Rica he focused on learning first-hand indigenous culture, rainforest ecology, and Costa Rican geography. He returned the second year with a monolithic raft and some SCUBA diving equipment to begin an adventure activities company, using the same boat to run SCUBA and river trips.

In Rowe's third year he focused more on equipment, river rafting, and mountaineering. His central location in Quepos had three uncrowded rivers ideal for rafting. Running day trips on the river helped him build the needed capital and marketing funds to establish a school for running courses more relevant to his philosophical approach to instructing. Rather than running quick commercial trips, he started leading trips whose objectives were to learn through adventure. He founded Save the Rainforest Expeditions School (STRES) to provide an avenue to work with youth applying the same philosophies as he used at COBS. STRES claimed to focus on teaching self-reliance, leadership, compassion, and service in a Costa Rican environment: Outward Bound principles were taught through rainforest adventures and service projects geared toward rainforest conservation as well as indigenous village assistance.

One year later, Rowe applied for and received a provisional charter (a charter that would become a permanent charter after three years) if OBCR maintained Outward Bound International (OBI) policies and procedures. In September 1997, OBCR received a full charter from Outward Bound International.

== Current ==
Outward Bound Costa Rica instructed 4,787 students in 2008 and totaled 23,816 SPDs (Student Participation Days). These numbers reflect students who participated in Open Enrollment courses(OBCR's scheduled courses), Girl Scouts courses, day and weekend courses with Costa Rica's local schools and organizations, custom-made courses, and Iztarú Scouting Camp courses.

== Course specifics ==
Calvin College student learns to surf on Costa Rica's Pacific Coast

Outward Bound Costa Rica courses must focus on physical challenge, personal development, and safety amidst rainforests, rivers, and beaches. Additionally, there is cultural immersion in remote rainforest villages run by native Costa Ricans. Course categories include:

- Adult Adventure
- Custom Courses
- Girl Scouts
- Summer Adventures
- Semester Courses
- Surfing

Locations include:

- Costa Rica: all parts for all courses
- Panama: Bocas del Toro for courses involving SCUBA and sea kayaking
- Nicaragua: San Juan del Sur for semester courses

== See also ==
- Category:Outward Bound
- Outward Bound International
- Outward Bound Singapore
- Outward Bound USA
