= Outbound =

Outbound refers to a direction of trains, other transport, or roads that travel away from the city center. It may also refer to:

== Arts, entertainment, and media ==
=== Music ===
- Outbound (Béla Fleck and the Flecktones album), 2000
- Outbound (Christian Bautista album)
- Outbound (Keldian album), an album by symphonic power metal band Keldian
- Outbound (Stuart Hamm album)

=== Other arts, entertainment, and media ===
- Outbound (film), a Romanian film
- Outbound (video game)

== Brands and enterprises ==
- Outbound Systems, manufacturer of the Outbound Laptop, an early Apple Macintosh compatible laptop computer
- Rans S-21 Outbound, an American kit aircraft design

== See also ==
- Outward Bound (disambiguation)
