= James Edward Mills =

African American author, freelance journalist, outdoor guide

James Edwards Mills (born 1966) is an African American freelance journalist, author, outdoor guide, and independent media producer who specializes in telling stories about outdoor recreation, environmental conservation, and sustainable living.

Mills is the author of The Adventure Gap: Changing the Face of the Outdoors. He has contributed to publications including National Geographic, Rock & Ice and Alpinist. Mills was one of the creative minds behind An American Ascent, a documentary chronicling the first all African American ascent of Denali, North America's highest peak.

== Biography ==
Mills grew up in Los Angeles, California. He developed an interest in the outdoors through his participation in a local Boy Scout troop. He received a bachelor's degree in anthropology from the University of California, Berkeley. Subsequently, Mills started an outdoor focused career in 1989, spending time as a guide, outfitter, independent sales representative, writer, and photographer.

In 2009, Mills founded "The Joy Trip Project", a news gathering and reporting organization that covers business, art and culture of the outdoor recreation industry. Through the blog and podcast, Mills covers the people and culture within the industry and unearths buried stories, particularly of adventurers of color.

In 2013, alongside Aparna Rajagopal-Durbin and Jeanne O’Brian of the National Outdoor Leadership School (NOLS), Mills helped organize Expedition Denali, the first all African American expedition to successfully summit Denali, North America's highest peak. A documentary about the Denali expedition entitled: An American Ascent was subsequently produced. Mills acted as a cowriter and coproducer on this production.

In 2014, Mills authored The Adventure Gap: Changing the Face of the Outdoors, which recounts Expedition Denali and explores the difficulties minorities face when seeking to utilize the nation's outdoor resources. It additionally highlights role models who found ways to participate in outdoor recreation despite these barriers.

Mills is a faculty assistant at the University of Wisconsin Nelson Institute for Environmental Studies. He teaches a summer course for undergraduate students on diversity, equity and inclusion in outdoor recreation and public management called "Outdoors for All."

== Awards & honors ==
- National Geographic Explorer (2023)
- Paul K. Petzoldt Award For Environmental Education (2016)
- Yosemite National Park Centennial Ambassador (2016)
- Banff Centre Mountain & Wilderness Writing Program Fellow (2014)

== Published works ==
=== Books ===
- The Adventure Gap: Changing the Face of the Outdoors, Seattle: 2014. ISBN 9781594858680.

=== Selected articles ===
- Here's how national parks are working to fight racism (2020)
- These people of color transformed U.S. national parks (2020)
- Opinion: Built on smoke (2020)
- No Pain, No Change (2019)

== Filmography ==
- An American Ascent (2014)

Credited as a cowriter and coproducer on the production.

- Breaking Trail (2021)

Credited as a coproducer on the production.

- Blackwaters (2023)

Credited as a costar and executive producer on the production.

=== Awards ===
An American Ascent won Best Feature Film at the Mountain & Adventure Film Festival. It was also won Best Documentary and Best Director at the San Diego Black Film Festival. The film was privately screened at the White House in June 2015.

Breaking Trail was an Official Selection for the 2021 Banff Mountain Film Festival. In 2022, Breaking Trail won Best Mountain Culture Film at the Vancouver International Mountain Film Fest, Eric Moe Best Short Film Award at the Environmental Film Festival, Best Short Film at the Frozen River Film Festival and Best Short Film (People's Choice) at the Boulder International Film Festival.

== Legacy ==
In 2020, Outside Magazine named The Adventure Gap one of the 10 "Outdoor Books that Shaped the Last Decade".
