= Wilderness Risk Management Conference =

The Wilderness Risk Management Conference (WRMC) is a professional event focused on risk management in outdoor recreation, adventure travel, and wilderness education. The primary aim of the conference is to provide educational resources for organizations and individuals working in wilderness and remote settings, with an emphasis on risk mitigation.

The WRMC was founded in 1994 through a collaboration of organizations with shared interests in outdoor risk management. The founding partners included the representatives from NOLS, Outward Bound USA, Wilderness Medical Society, Exum Mountain Guides, Association for Experiential Education, National Park Service, National Safety Network, American Alpine Club, and Outdoor Network.

== Conference Topics ==
The WRMC covers a variety of topics that fall into a few major categories including: emergency planning and crisis response, field practices, legal considerations, program administration, and staff training and decision making. Additionally, the conference provides structured networking time to meet with other professionals working and managing field programs in the United States, Canada, and internationally.

== Conference Locations ==
2026 - Portland, Oregon

2025 - Portland, Maine

2024 - Salt Lake City

2023 - Portland, Oregon

2022 - Burlington, Vermont

2021 - Virtual (COVID)

2020 - Virtual (COVID)

2019 - Albuquerque, New Mexico

2018 - Portland, Maine

2016 - Salt Lake City, Utah

2015 - Portland, Oregon

2014 - Atlanta, Georgia

2013 - Grand Teton National Park, Wyoming

2012 - Portland, Oregon

2011 - Boston, Massachusetts

2010 - Colorado Springs, Colorado

2009 - Durham, North Carolina

2008 - Grand Teton National Park, Wyoming

2007 - Banff, Alberta, Canada

2006 - Killington, Vermont

2000 - Anchorage, Alaska

1999 -

1998 -

1997 - Salt Lake City, Utah

1996 - Sunday River, Maine

1995 - Estes Park. Colorado

1994 - Conway, Washington
