= Student Conservation Association =

American conservation nonprofit

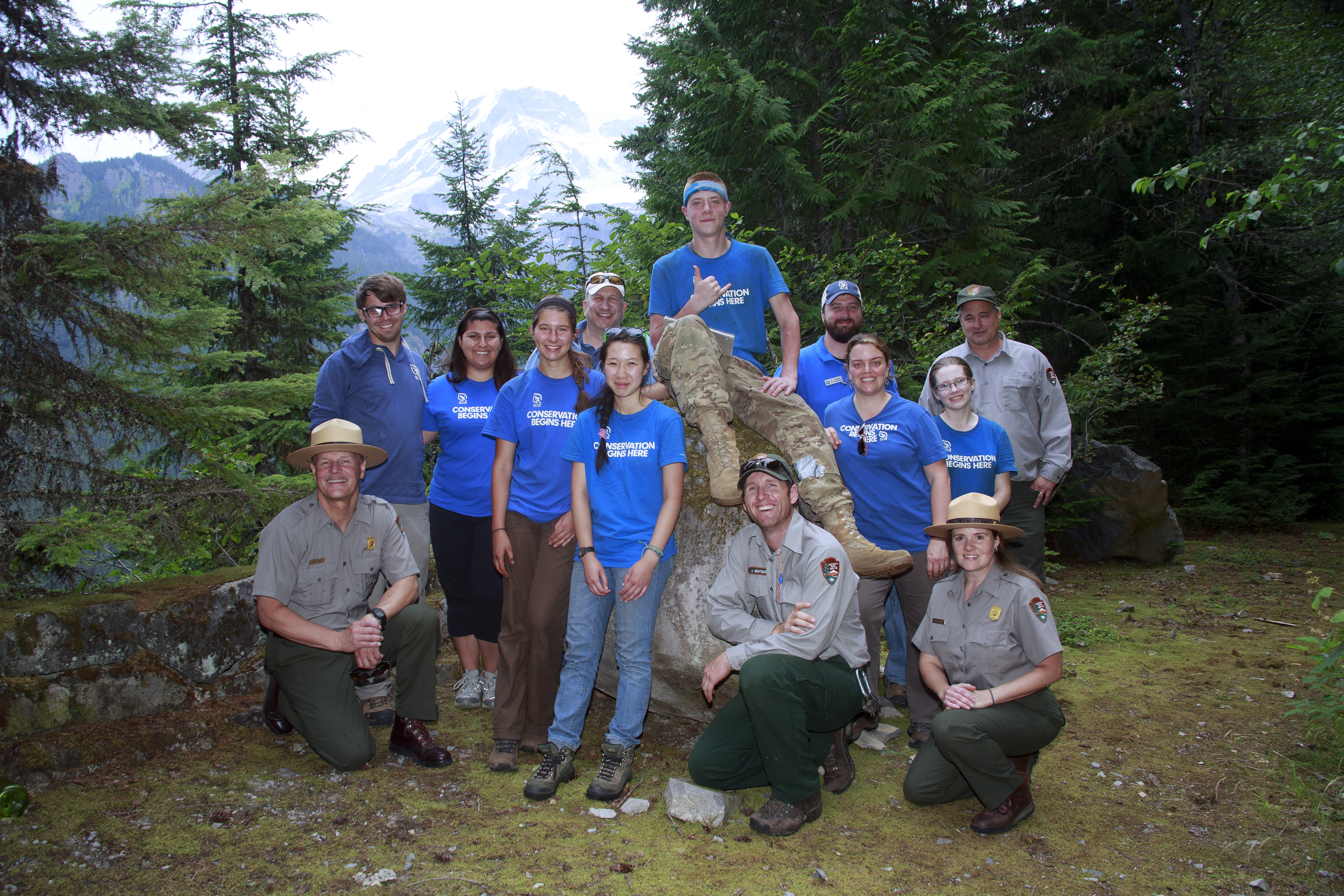
- SCA Community Crew in 2013
- Nickname: SCA
- Founded: 1957
- Founder: Elizabeth Titus Putnam
- Purpose: Conservation service
- Location: Charlestown, New Hampshire, U.S.
- Region served: United States
- Website: http://www.thesca.org

The Student Conservation Association (SCA) is a non-profit group in the United States whose mission is to build the next generation of conservation leaders and inspire lifelong stewardship of the environment and communities by engaging young people in hands-on service to the land through service opportunities, outdoor skills, and leadership training.

== History ==
In 1955, Elizabeth Titus Putnam, a student at Vassar College, wrote her senior thesis, "A Proposed Student Conservation Corps". The idea, modeled after the federal Civilian Conservation Corps program (1933–42), was to take the burden of labor-intensive jobs such as entrance fee collecting or trail work from the National Park Service and shift to the SCC. Putnum worked with Martha Hayne Talbot to advocate for the proposal to the superintendents of Olympic, Grand Teton, Mount Rainier and Yellowstone National Parks. In 1957, the Student Conservation Program (forerunner to SCA) had two separate programs in Grand Teton National Park and Olympic National Park. In 1964, the Student Conservation Program incorporated as the Student Conservation Association. Since then, the organization has grown significantly and currently places more than 4,000 volunteers annually in public lands and urban green spaces.

== Work programs ==
The SCA's 4,000 volunteers annually provide more than 2 million hours of conservation service, including trail construction, wildlife research, habitat restoration and GIS mapping; in parks, forests, refuges and urban green spaces in all 50 states. SCA members annually serve more than 500 natural and cultural sites in all 50 states. More than 20 million people directly benefit from SCA conservation services each year. Since 1957, SCA's 50,000+ members around the world have provided service valued at over half a billion dollars. SCA members build or maintain more than 2,500 miles of trail per year. 70% of SCA alumni remain active in conservation in their careers or communities.

=== Conservation crews ===
Every summer, the SCA places over 600 young people aged 15+ into crews of six or eight in national parks, national wilderness areas, national monuments, Bureau of Land Management-controlled lands, military ranges, and other federally controlled lands throughout the United States. The crews are divided into frontcountry and backcountry crews, with frontcountry crews being based within one mile of a road and most likely having easier access to showers, stores, and park rangers. Backcountry crews are usually more isolated.

A Park Service Sign in Voyageurs National Park

The projects performed by the crews vary. The Conservation Crews typically do trail work, usually trail construction or erosion control, depending on the needs of the park. Other projects may include restoration of tourist-impacted areas and invasive species removal. The projects last from 21–30 days with a 4–5 day recreational trip at the end.

The program had been free to students except for the cost of transportation to the prearranged meeting location, usually a nearby airport. As of spring 2016, students are charged a flat $500 fee, though financial aid may be available. Also, students provide most of their own necessary outdoor gear. Expenses are shared between the SCA, agency partners, and individual donors. Financial assistance is available to cover transportation costs, and SCA can provide gear to those needing it.

Once at their worksite, the students work eight hours a day, six days a week. The crews are led usually by two trained, experienced crew leaders, men and women over the age of 21. Most crew leaders are college students or teachers, though there are leaders in their 60s. The sponsoring organization such as the Park Service or Bureau of Land Management provides instruction and tools, but the crews are responsible for completing their job without supervision. On days off, they may undertake an ambitious hike or just relax around camp. At the end of their conservation project, all crews take a short recreation trip to enjoy the area, often a backpacking trip.

The SCA lists a catalog of conservation crew work sites on their website. For conservation crews, SCA begins reviewing applications in January and offers of placement are sent out beginning in April.

=== Conservation interns ===
Through partnerships with agencies such as the National Park Service, the SCA places people 18 and over into internship positions. There are two different types: short and long term internships. The short term internships last under three months, while long term internships can last from 6 to 12 months. The jobs performed by the interns varies. They can include backcountry patrol, working with visitors, and conducting ecological surveys. The interns are provided with a stipend, housing (in most cases), and an AmeriCorps Stipend. The admissions process for each internship is on a rolling basis, with each internship position having a closing date. Students can apply for as many positions as they wish.

Many short-term Conservation Internship Positions involve work such as soil and water monitoring, GIS work, naturalist work, interpretation, visitor assistance, and more. The majority of short-term conservation internship positions are during the summer season, but positions are also offered all year long.

Interns often work either on a one-to-one basis with state or federal professionals, or in groups as part of the Conservation Corps.

=== Community programs ===
The SCA offers community programs in the following cities: Houston, Stamford, Seattle, Edmonds, Oakland, Washington, D.C., Baltimore, Chicago, Detroit, Manchester, Milwaukee, New Jersey, Philadelphia, Camden, New Jersey, Anchorage, Alaska, New York City, New York, Seattle, and Pittsburgh.

The Conservation Leadership Corps (CLC) program takes place year-round in regional offices. The format of the CLC program varies from region to region. All students successfully completing the CLC program will have the opportunity to participate in a summer Conservation Crew and will have their airfare covered by their regional office. As part of the CLC, members volunteer on weekends throughout the school year in their home city, build trails, restore river and lakefront environments, conserve habitats, learn about the environment through field trips, go on weekend camping excursions, and give back to the community through service projects.

The Summer Community Crews are six to seven week crews over the summer in which students complete trail maintenance and site restoration projects in public parks, learn about the local environment through field trips led by the Crew Leader, visit local parks, learn outdoor skills, and go on a recreational camping trip.

=== Conservation Corps ===
At the Conservation Corps sites, members learn conservation skills. Corps are teams with members living and working with others who share a connection to the land and the people who live there.

Corps members spend 3–10 months of their time devoted to critical environmental issues such as wildfire management and education, trail restoration and maintenance, environmental education, and invasive species eradication.

== Environmental education ==
The SCA emphasizes environmental education in their programming. The organization encourages students and members to engage with the natural environment with the goal that the students will become attached to the natural world, and then more likely to preserve and protect it.

== Wilderness Risk Management Conference ==
Additionally, the SCA along with Outward Bound and NOLS, sponsor the Wilderness Risk Management Conference.

== Gallery of the Student Conservation Association at work ==
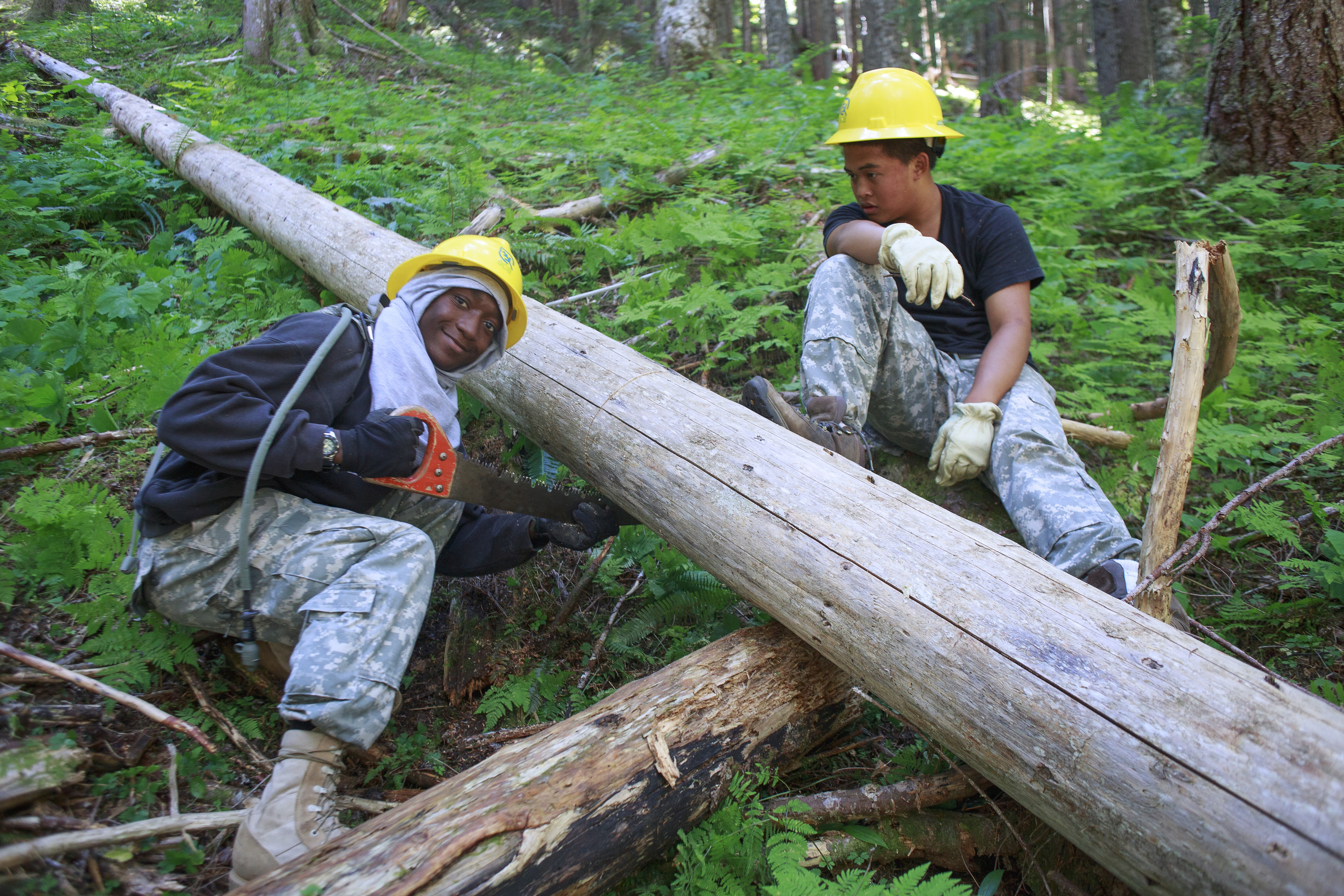

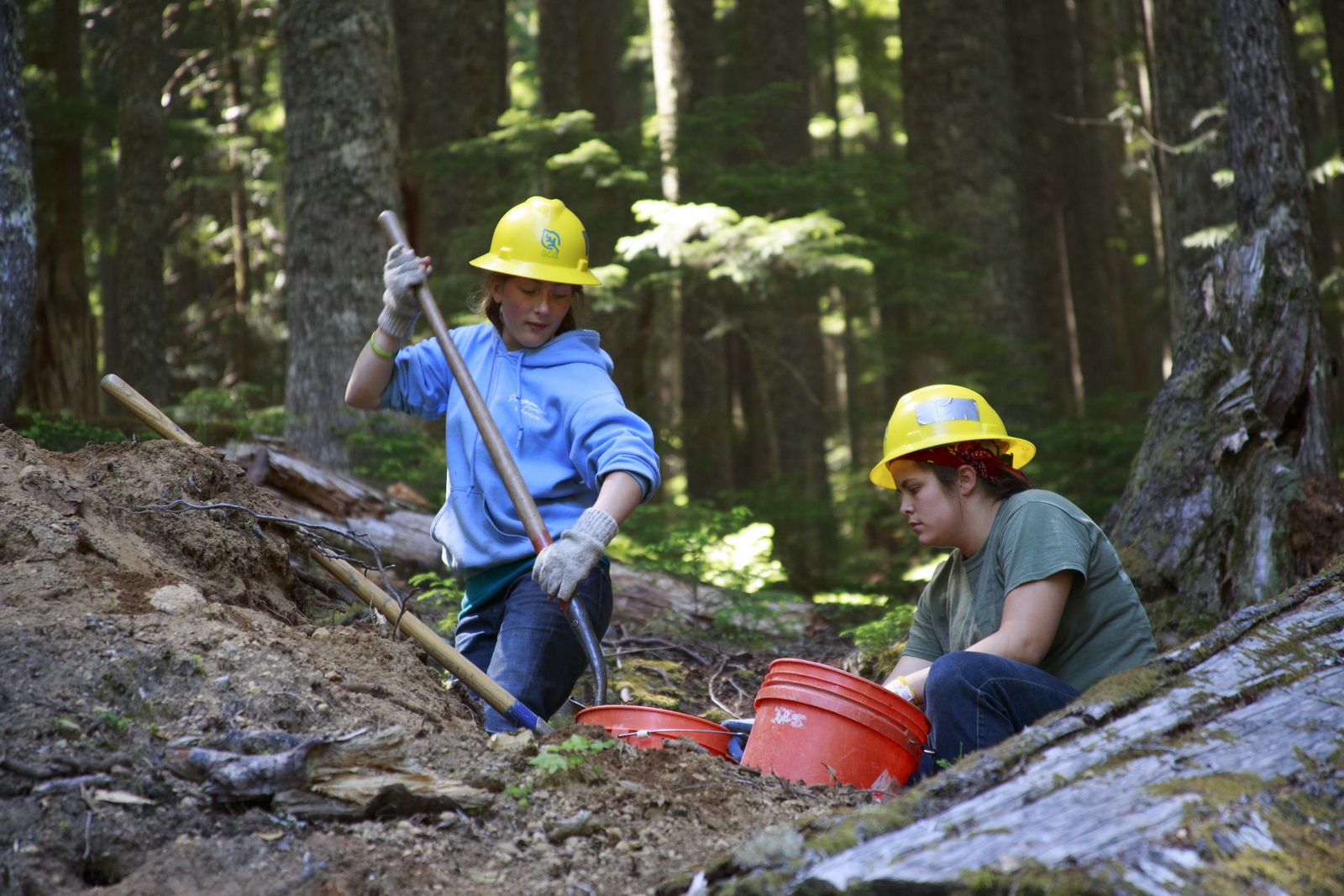

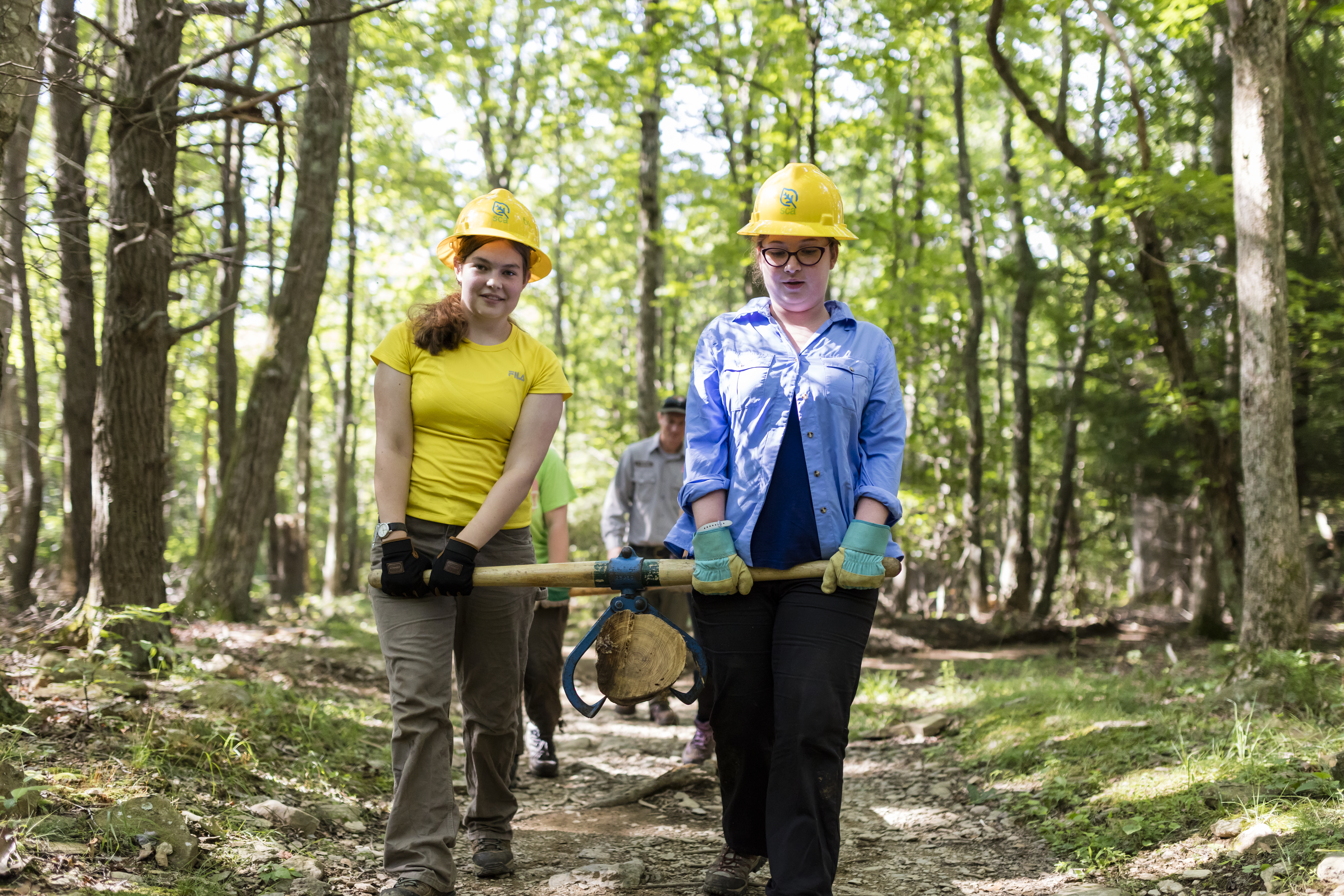

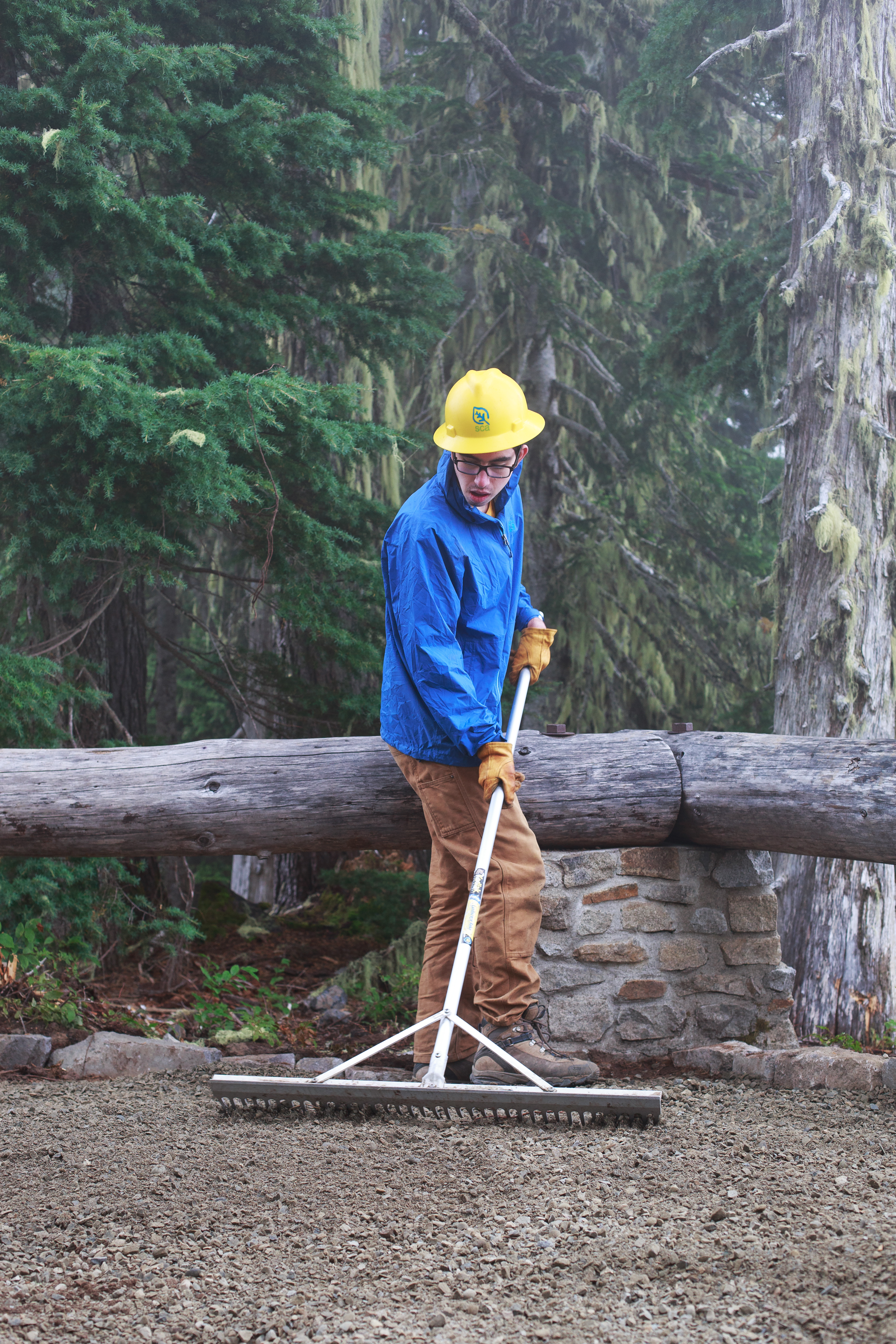

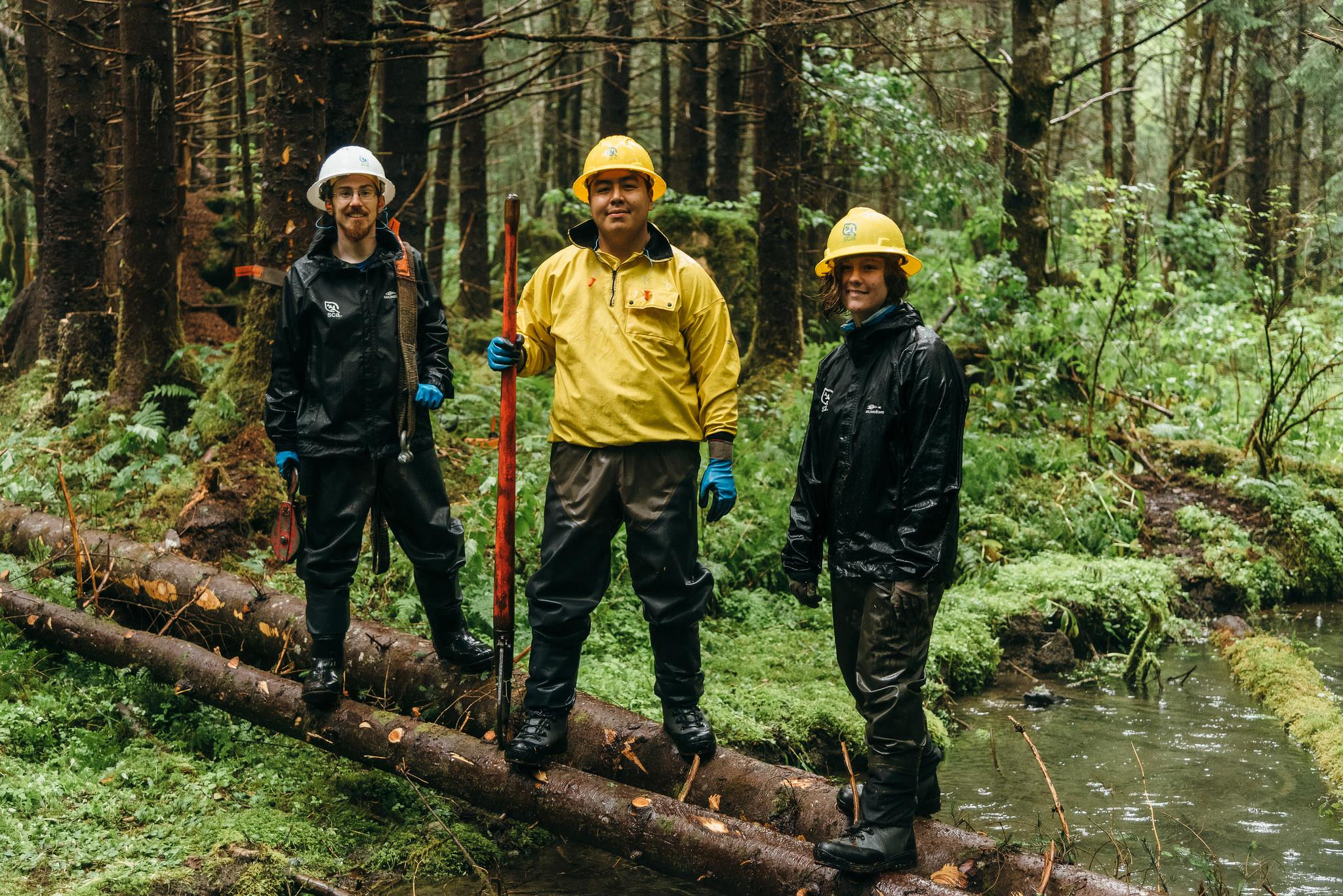

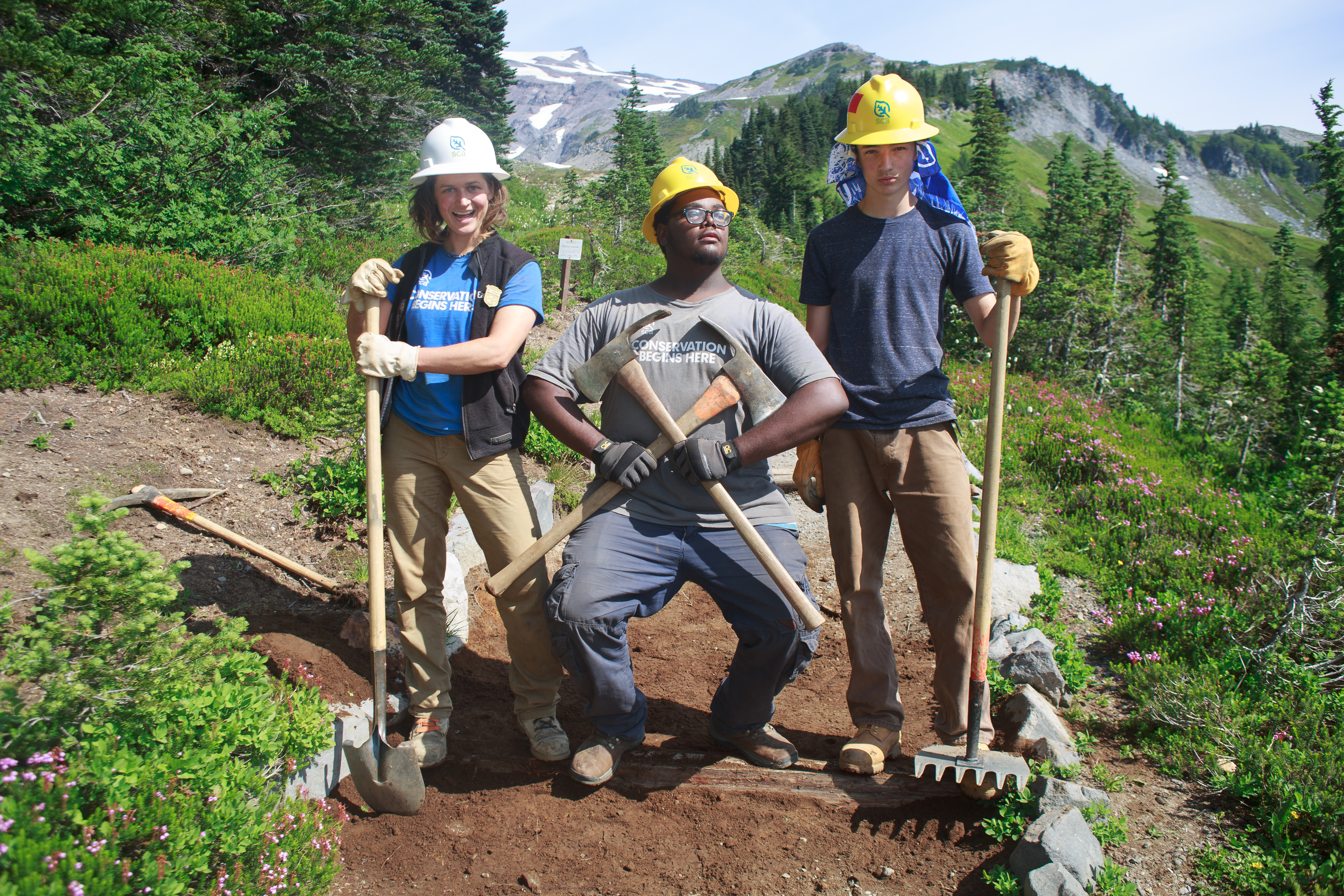

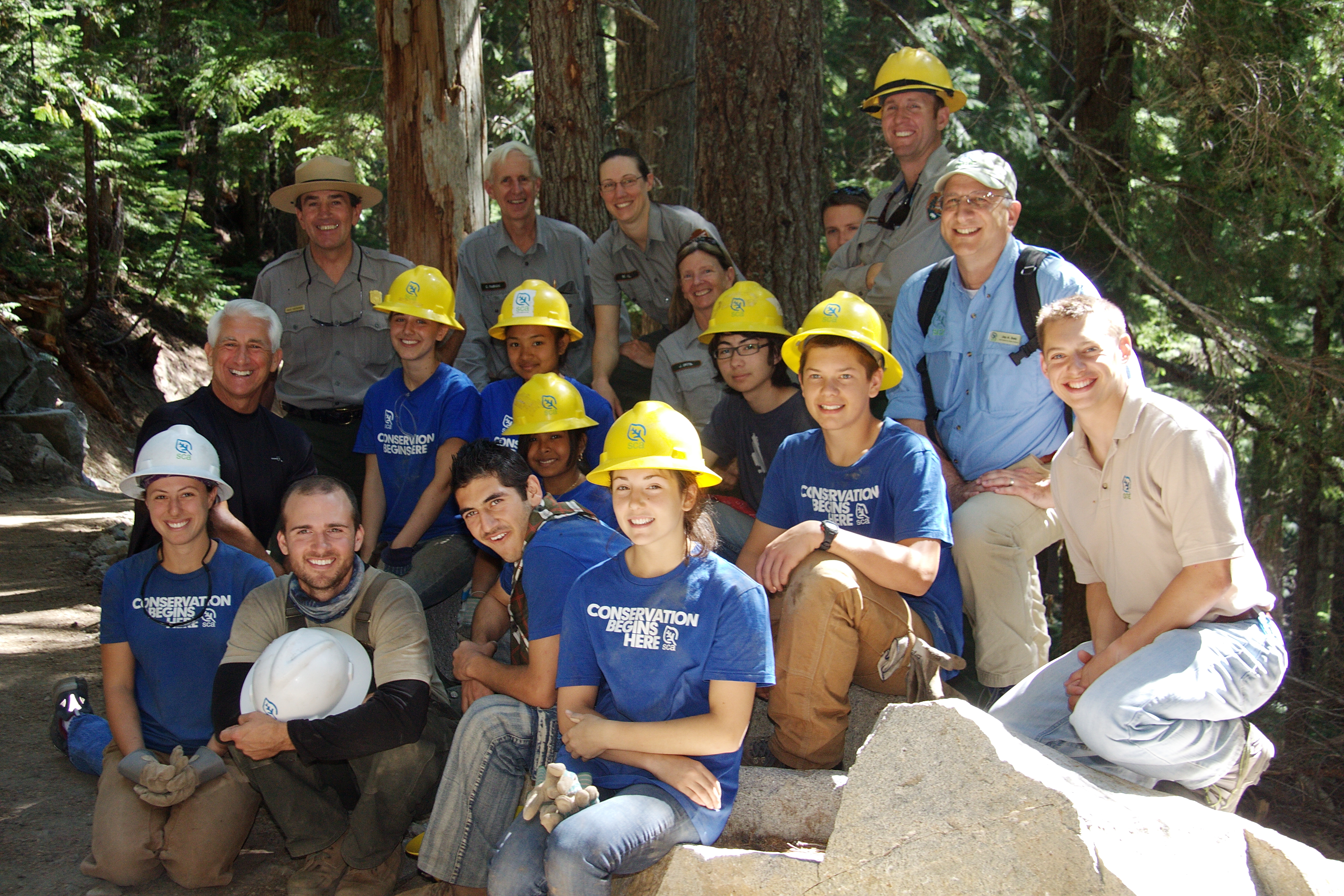

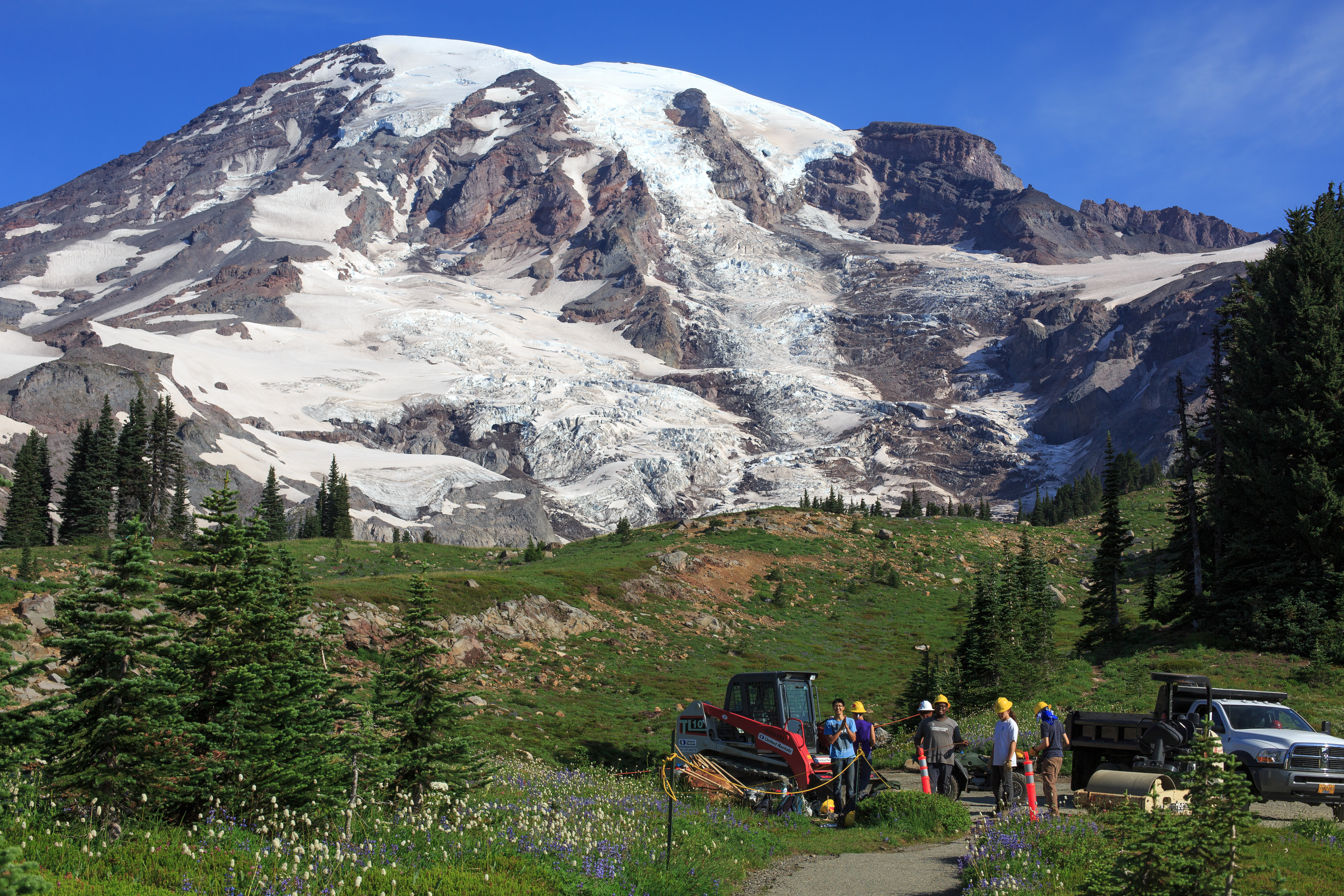

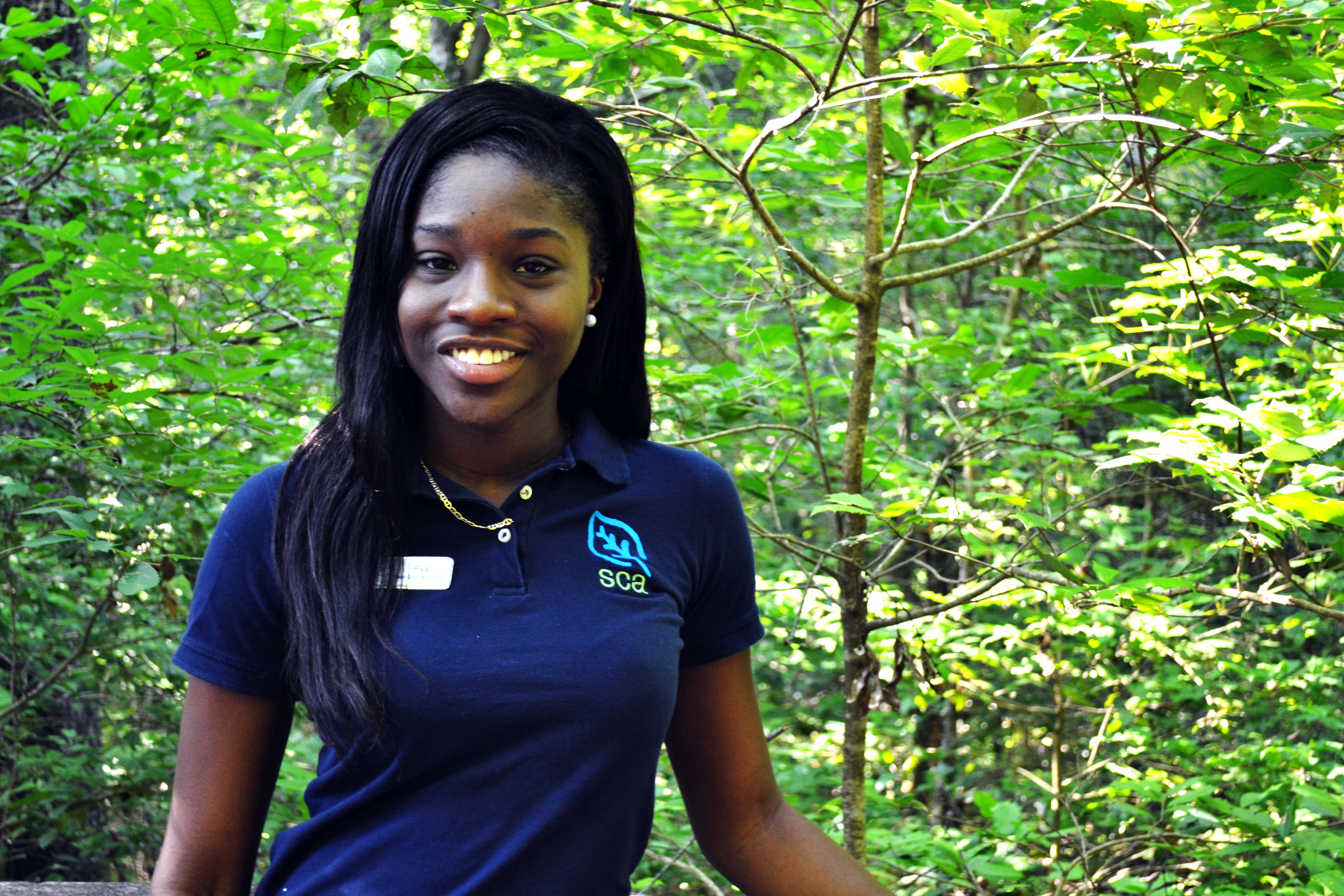

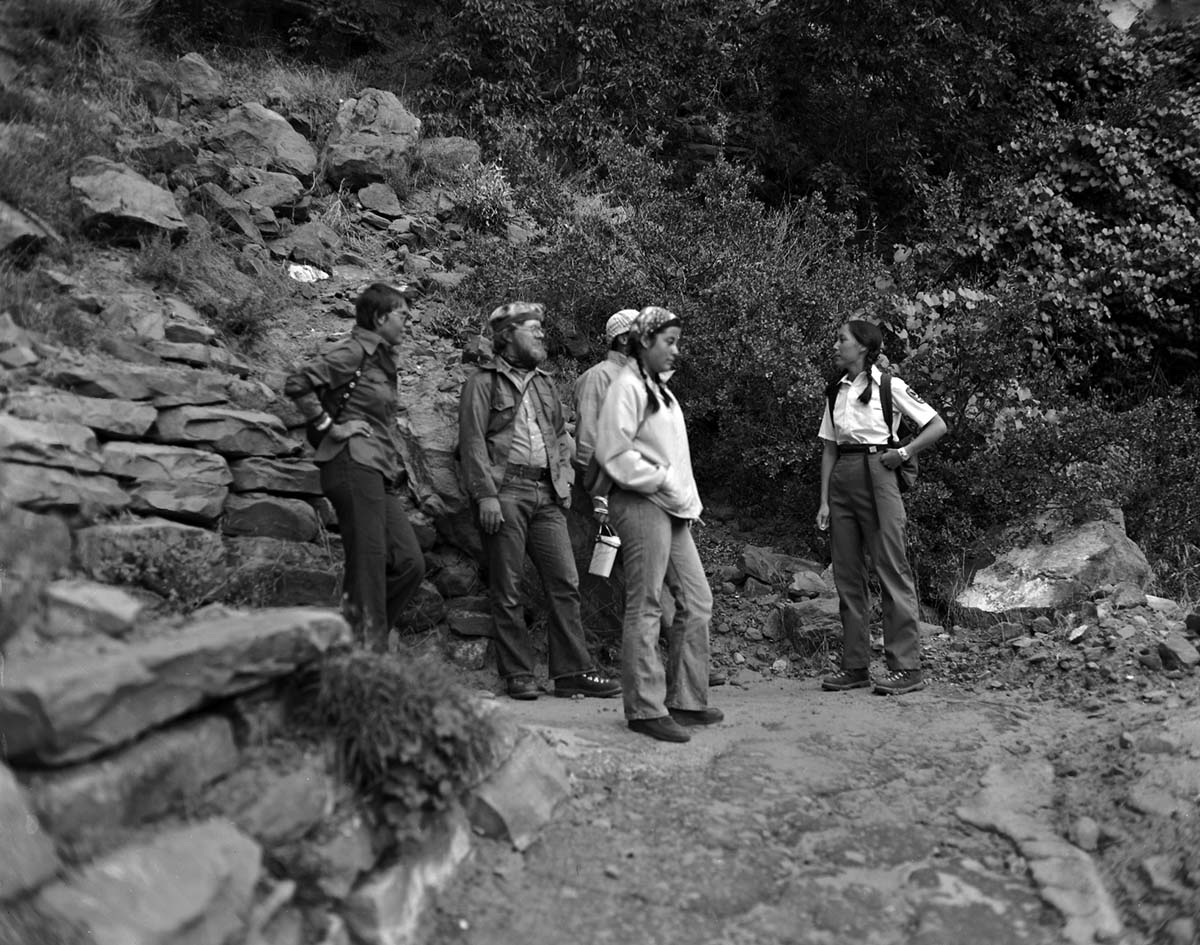
