= Ngākuta Bay =

Rural settlement in Marlborough, New Zealand

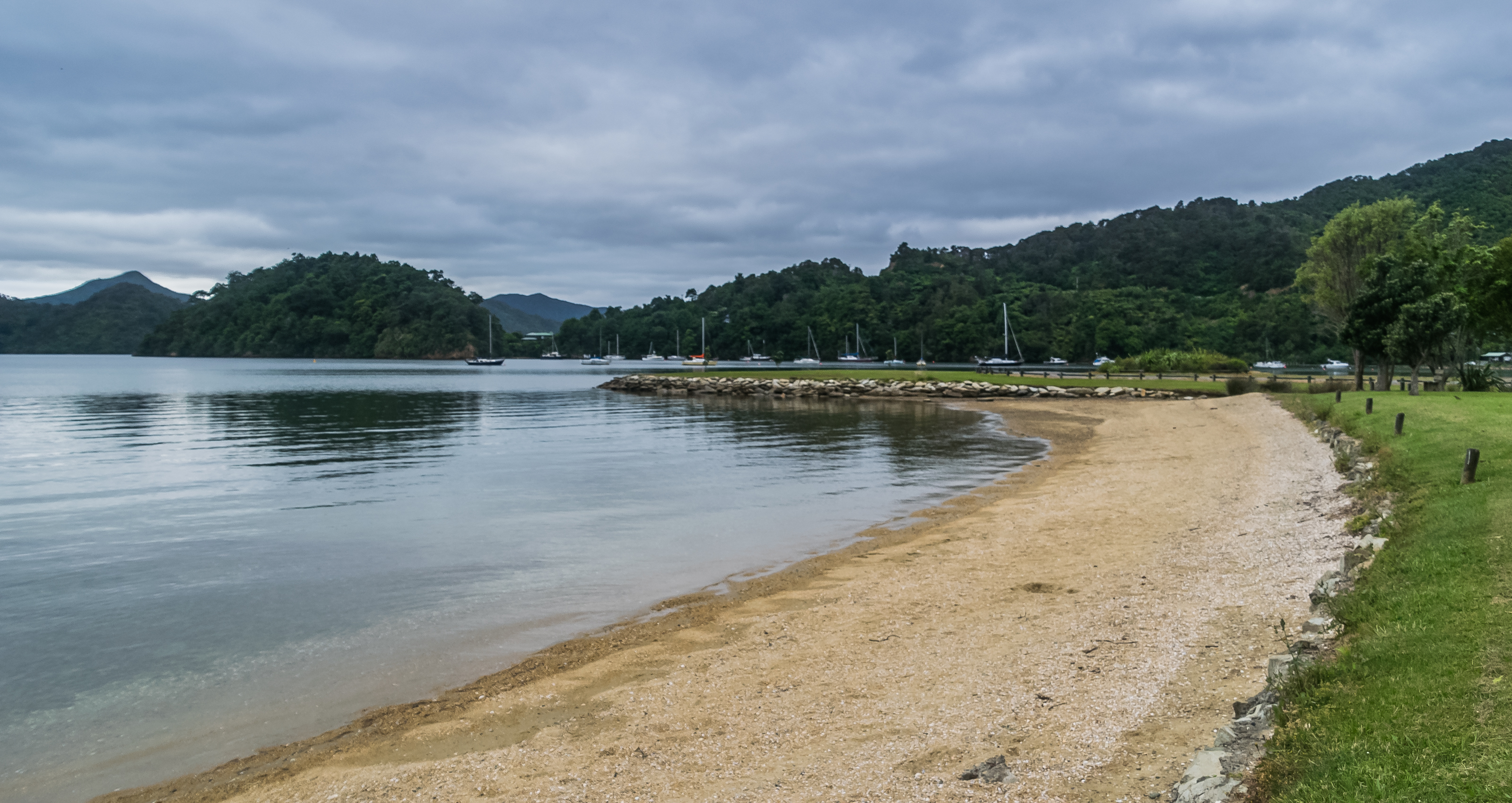
- Ngākuta Bay
- Interactive map of Ngākuta Bay
- Coordinates: 41.273°S 173.962°E
- Country: New Zealand
- Region: Marlborough
- Ward: Marlborough Sounds General Ward; Marlborough Māori Ward
- Electorates: Kaikōura; Te Tai Tonga (Māori)

Government
  - Territorial Authority: Marlborough District Council
  - Marlborough District Mayor: Nadine Taylor
  - Kaikōura MP: Stuart Smith

Area
  - Total: 0.31 km^{2} (0.12 sq mi)

Population (June 2025)
  - Total: 70
  - Density: 230/km^{2} (580/sq mi)

Ngākuta Bay is a settlement and bay in the Marlborough Sounds, New Zealand. The bay is part of Grove Arm in Queen Charlotte Sound / Tōtaranui. Picton is about 11 km to the southeast via Queen Charlotte Drive. The bay was given its official name of Ngākuta Bay on 27 May 2021 and it has been known as Ngakuta Bay since at least 1865.

== Naming ==
Ngākuta is a combination of the Te Reo Māori words ngā, meaning plural "the", and kuta, a name for the tall spike sedge Eleocharis sphacelata. Together ngākuta means "the tall spike sedges".

== Demographics ==
Ngākuta Bay is described by Statistics New Zealand as a rural settlement. It covers 0.31 km^{2} (0.12 sq mi) and had an estimated population of 70 as of June 2025, with a population density of 226 people per km^{2}. It is part of the larger Marlborough Sounds East statistical area.

Historical population
Year	Pop.	±% p.a.
2006	60	—
2013	63	+0.70%
2018	57	−1.98%
2023	69	+3.90%

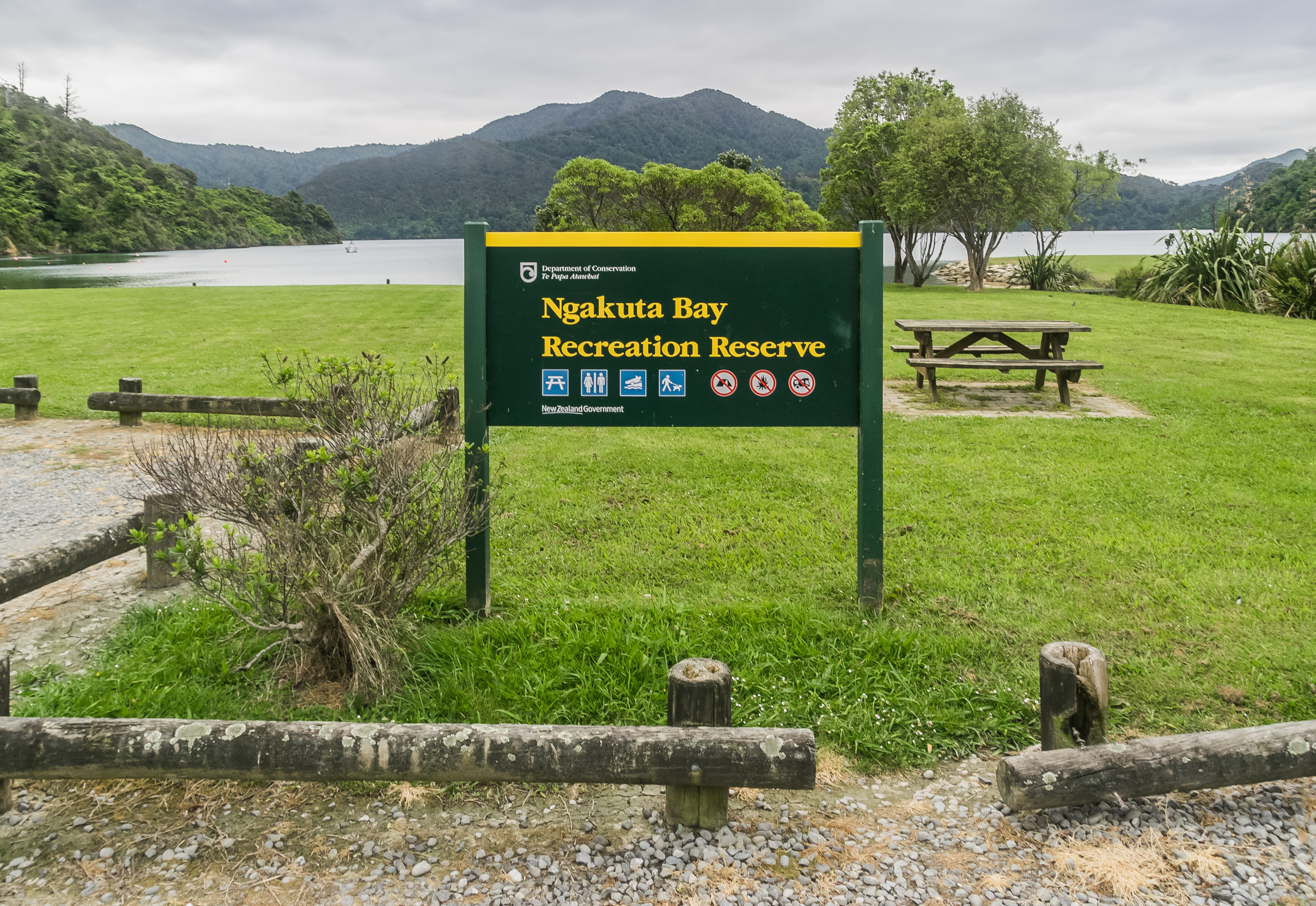
Ngakuta Bay Recreation Reserve

Ngākuta Bay had a population of 69 in the 2023 New Zealand census, an increase of 12 people (21.1%) since the 2018 census, and an increase of 6 people (9.5%) since the 2013 census. There were 33 males and 39 females in 36 dwellings. 4.3% of people identified as LGBTIQ+. The median age was 64.9 years (compared with 38.1 years nationally). There were 6 people (8.7%) aged under 15 years, 3 (4.3%) aged 15 to 29, 24 (34.8%) aged 30 to 64, and 33 (47.8%) aged 65 or older.

People could identify as more than one ethnicity. The results were 91.3% European (Pākehā), and 4.3% Māori. English was spoken by 95.7%, and other languages by 4.3%. No language could be spoken by 4.3% (e.g. too young to talk). The percentage of people born overseas was 21.7, compared with 28.8% nationally.

Religious affiliations were 39.1% Christian, and 4.3% other religions. People who answered that they had no religion were 47.8%, and 8.7% of people did not answer the census question.

Of those at least 15 years old, 24 (38.1%) people had a bachelor's or higher degree, 33 (52.4%) had a post-high school certificate or diploma, and 6 (9.5%) people exclusively held high school qualifications. The median income was $28,200, compared with $41,500 nationally. 3 people (4.8%) earned over $100,000 compared to 12.1% nationally. The employment status of those at least 15 was 24 (38.1%) full-time, 6 (9.5%) part-time, and 3 (4.8%) unemployed.
