= Anakiwa =

Rural settlement in Marlborough, New Zealand

- Village
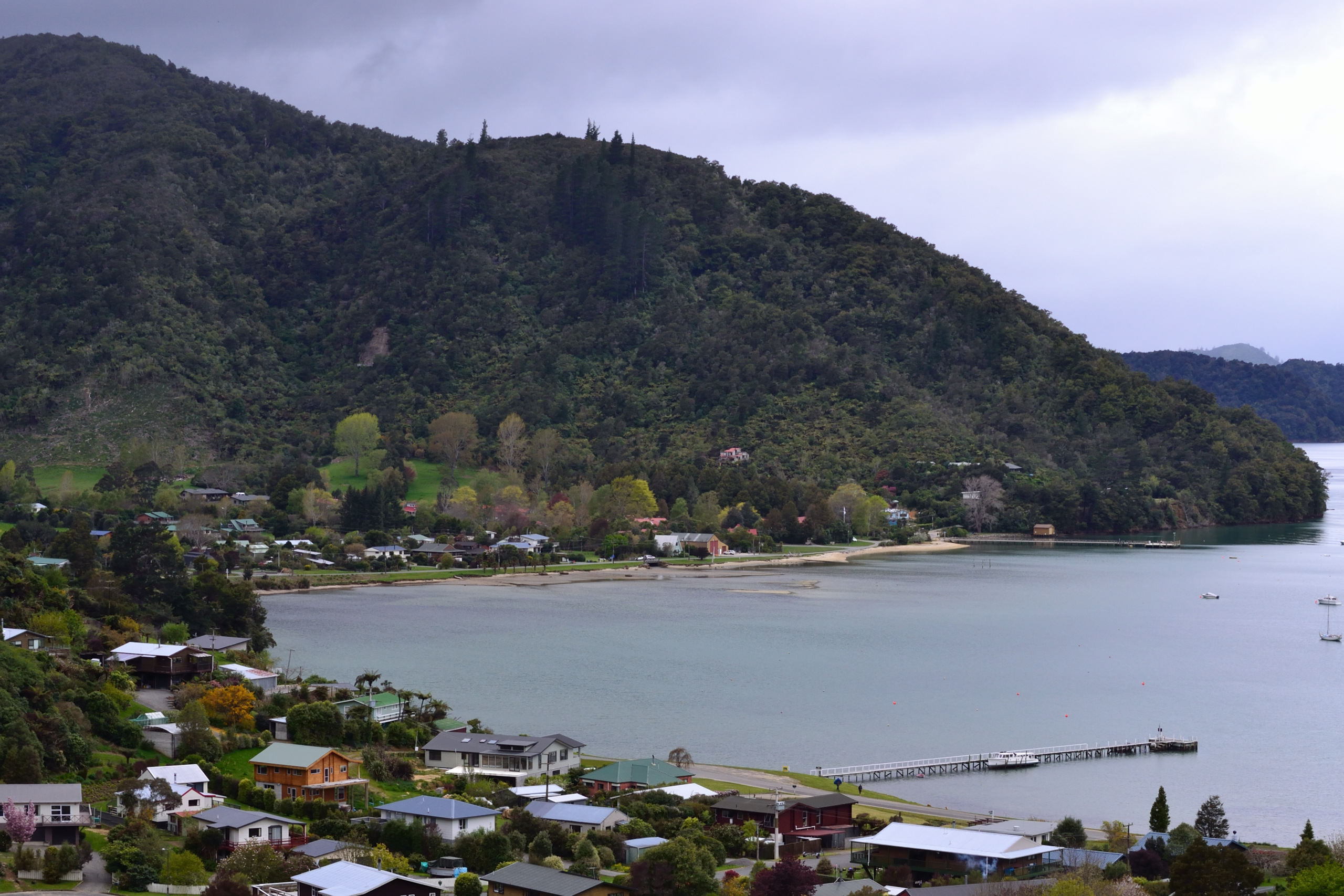
- Anakiwa from the south-west, looking toward Outward Bound
- Interactive map of Anakiwa
- Coordinates: 41°15′52″S 173°54′46″E
- Country: New Zealand
- Region: Marlborough
- Ward: Marlborough Sounds General Ward; Marlborough Māori Ward
- Electorates: Kaikōura; Te Tai Tonga (Māori)

Government
  - Territorial Authority: Marlborough District Council
  - Marlborough District Mayor: Nadine Taylor
  - Kaikōura MP: Stuart Smith
  - Te Tai Tonga MP: Tākuta Ferris

Area
  - Total: 1.17 km^{2} (0.45 sq mi)

Population (June 2025)
  - Total: 170
  - Density: 150/km^{2} (380/sq mi)
- Postcode(s): 7281

Anakiwa is a coastal residential village in the Marlborough region of New Zealand. It sits at the head of Queen Charlotte Sound/Tōtaranui, one of the Marlborough Sounds, 23 km (14 mi) west of Picton and 18 km (11 mi) east of Havelock. At the 2018 census, the village had a usual resident population of 171.

Anakiwa is also the terminus of the Queen Charlotte Track, with most hikers choosing to complete their walk here, before catching a water taxi back to Picton.

== History ==
Anakiwa had long been a Māori settlement, most recently occupied by members of the Ngāti Rāhiri hapū of Te Āti Awa iwi until 1859 when they returned to Taranaki, at least in part to fight in the First Taranaki War. In earlier centuries, the Ngai Tara iwi had influence over the area. It was included in the New Zealand Company's deed of purchase in 1839, though there is doubt that the chiefs of the region understood the document or that it was correctly translated.

In 1864, the New Zealand Government granted land to the Beauchamp family for farming in Anakiwa. In 1928 the family built a guesthouse on the site, which was purchased with donated funds by Hamish Thomas as the site for Outward Bound New Zealand. It was opened as "The Cobham Outward Bound School" in 1962 by Governor-General Lord Cobham.

Anakiwa School was extant between 1910 and 1934. It closed in 1936. The Cobham Outward Bound School is sometimes called Anakiwa School.

Tirimoana is a settlement within Anakiwa which was originally known as the Tirimoana Subdivision of the farm lands that once occupied the area to the south and west of Outward Bound School. It contains Tirimoana Reserve.

Boundary Gate Corner which is 3.25 kilometres from the Queen Charlotte Drive intersection, marked the boundary between the two farms in the early 1900s, and a gate once stood here across the access road. Today, there is a sign and bench seat which marks this location.

== Demographics ==
Anakiwa is described by Stats NZ as a rural settlement. It covers 1.17 km^{2} (0.45 sq mi) and had an estimated population of 170 as of June 2025, with a population density of 145 people per km^{2}. It is part of the larger Marlborough Sounds East statistical area.

Historical population for Anakiwa
Year	Pop.	±% p.a.
2006	183	—
2013	180	−0.24%
2018	171	−1.02%
2023	171	+0.00%

Anakiwa had a population of 171 in the 2023 New Zealand census, unchanged since the 2018 census, and a decrease of 9 people (−5.0%) since the 2013 census. There were 84 males and 87 females in 93 dwellings. 5.3% of people identified as LGBTIQ+. The median age was 55.4 years (compared with 38.1 years nationally). There were 15 people (8.8%) aged under 15 years, 18 (10.5%) aged 15 to 29, 75 (43.9%) aged 30 to 64, and 63 (36.8%) aged 65 or older.

People could identify as more than one ethnicity. The results were 96.5% European (Pākehā), 10.5% Māori, 3.5% Pasifika, 3.5% Asian, and 3.5% other, which includes people giving their ethnicity as "New Zealander". English was spoken by 100.0%, Māori by 1.8%, and other languages by 7.0%. The percentage of people born overseas was 28.1, compared with 28.8% nationally.

Religious affiliations were 29.8% Christian, and 1.8% other religions. People who answered that they had no religion were 63.2%, and 3.5% of people did not answer the census question.

Of those at least 15 years old, 57 (36.5%) people had a bachelor's or higher degree, 75 (48.1%) had a post-high school certificate or diploma, and 21 (13.5%) people exclusively held high school qualifications. The median income was $35,800, compared with $41,500 nationally. 9 people (5.8%) earned over $100,000 compared to 12.1% nationally. The employment status of those at least 15 was 60 (38.5%) full-time, 27 (17.3%) part-time, and 3 (1.9%) unemployed.

=== Marlborough Sounds East ===
Marlborough Sounds East, which also includes Ngākuta Bay, covers 1,043.10 km^{2} (402.74 sq mi) and had an estimated population of 2,040 as of June 2025, with a population density of 2.0 people per km^{2}.

Historical population for Marlborough Sounds East
Year	Pop.	±% p.a.
2006	2,043	—
2013	1,854	−1.38%
2018	1,845	−0.10%
2023	2,028	+1.91%
The 2006 population is for a larger area of 1,043.57 km^{2}. Source:

Marlborough Sounds East had a population of 2,028 in the 2023 New Zealand census, an increase of 183 people (9.9%) since the 2018 census, and an increase of 174 people (9.4%) since the 2013 census. There were 1,041 males, 981 females, and 6 people of other genders in 1,008 dwellings. 2.5% of people identified as LGBTIQ+. The median age was 57.7 years (compared with 38.1 years nationally). There were 210 people (10.4%) aged under 15 years, 186 (9.2%) aged 15 to 29, 966 (47.6%) aged 30 to 64, and 666 (32.8%) aged 65 or older.

People could identify as more than one ethnicity. The results were 93.9% European (Pākehā); 10.7% Māori; 1.3% Pasifika; 1.5% Asian; 0.3% Middle Eastern, Latin American and African New Zealanders (MELAA); and 3.1% other, which includes people giving their ethnicity as "New Zealander". English was spoken by 99.3%, Māori by 1.9%, and other languages by 7.2%. No language could be spoken by 0.6% (e.g. too young to talk). New Zealand Sign Language was known by 0.3%. The percentage of people born overseas was 19.2, compared with 28.8% nationally.

Religious affiliations were 28.0% Christian, 0.4% Hindu, 0.4% Māori religious beliefs, 0.6% Buddhist, 0.3% New Age, 0.1% Jewish, and 0.9% other religions. People who answered that they had no religion were 60.1%, and 9.3% of people did not answer the census question.

Of those at least 15 years old, 372 (20.5%) people had a bachelor's or higher degree, 1,008 (55.4%) had a post-high school certificate or diploma, and 435 (23.9%) people exclusively held high school qualifications. The median income was $33,800, compared with $41,500 nationally. 141 people (7.8%) earned over $100,000 compared to 12.1% nationally. The employment status of those at least 15 was 765 (42.1%) full-time, 324 (17.8%) part-time, and 21 (1.2%) unemployed.

== Services ==
Anakiwa has two public wharves, each with a public boat ramp. There are a total of 5 publicly accessible boat ramps along the Anakiwa foreshore. There are numerous lodges, backpacker, and bed & breakfast accommodation within the village, as well as a seasonal store which caters to Queen Charlotte track hikers, as well as other visitors. Public toilets are located metres from the entrance to the Queen Charlotte track, along with a payphone in a small kiosk shelter.

Other nearby services, within a 7 km radius, in the Linkwater valley include a Challenge Petrol station & store; camping ground with cabins; motel; primary school; community hall; and a rural fire station.
