= Outbound (video game) =

2026 video game

- Developer: Square Glade Games
- Publisher: Silver Lining Games
- Composer: Tyler Zane
- Engine: Unity Engine
- Platforms: Nintendo Switch; Nintendo Switch 2; PlayStation 5; Windows; Xbox Series X/S
- Release: Windows, Xbox Series X/S; 11 May 2026; Nintendo Switch, Nintendo Switch 2, PlayStation 5; 14 May 2026
- Genre: Adventure
- Modes: Single-player, multiplayer

Outbound is a 2026 adventure video game developed by Square Glade Games and published by Silver Lining Games. It was released on 11 May 2026 for Windows and Xbox Series X/S, and on 14 May 2026 for the Nintendo Switch, Nintendo Switch 2 and PlayStation 5.

== Gameplay ==
Outbound is a cozy open-world adventure game set in an utopian future. The game is centred around a trip in a campervan which players can select and customise, including the interior, to drive and explore the world. Players can craft items, gather resources, unlock blueprints and complete objectives. After completing the in-game tutorial, co-operative gameplay with up to four players is also supported.

== Development and release ==
Developer Square Glade Games is based in the Netherlands. The reveal trailer for the game was first shown in February 2024. In July 2025, Square Glade Games co-founder Marc Volger announced that Outbound would release on PlayStation 5 alongside the previously announced version for Windows and Xbox Series X/S. Versions were also later announced for the Nintendo Switch and Nintendo Switch 2.

In February 2026, a demo was released for Windows via Steam. In March, demos were released for the Nintendo Switch, Nintendo Switch 2, PlayStation 5 and Xbox Series X/S.

Initially scheduled to launch on 23 April 2026, the game was delayed to 14 May 2026 due to an issue that was identified. Due to Subnautica 2 launching on Steam and Xbox on 14 May, the release date for Outbound on these platforms were brought forward to 11 May 2026, with the release date for the other platforms unaffected and subsequently releasing on 14 May as planned.

== Reception ==
Reception

Aggregate scores
Aggregator	Score
Metacritic	(PC) 64/100 (PS5) 69/100
OpenCritic	26% recommend

Review scores
Publication	Score
Destructoid	6/10
Nintendo Life	7/10
PC Games (DE)	8/10

Outbound received "mixed or average" reviews from critics, according to review aggregator site Metacritic. Fellow review aggregator OpenCritic assessed that the game received weak approval, being recommended by 26% of critics.

Destructoid rated it 6/10, and wrote that it "nails atmosphere and customization, but struggles to keep its open world engaging." PC Games rated the game 8/10 and describes that it provides "a good mix of discovery, crafting, and building." Nintendo Life rated it 7/10 and praised the exploration and gameplay loop.
