= Outward Bound New Zealand =

Educational organization in New Zealand

Outward Bound Trust New Zealand
- Abbreviation: OBNZ
- Formation: 1962; 64 years ago
- Founded at: Anakiwa
- Type: Non-profit organization
- Purpose: Outdoor Education
- Headquarters: Auckland
- Location: Anakiwa
- Region served: New Zealand
- CEO: Malindi Maclean
- Affiliations: Outward Bound International
- Website: outwardbound.co.nz

Outward Bound New Zealand (OBNZ) is a non-profit organisation providing experiential education in New Zealand. Its stated goal is to help participants reach their potential "through challenge in the outdoors". In total, more than fifty thousand students have attended the school.

Like other Outward Bound International member organisations, its educational philosophy is derived from the work of German educator Kurt Hahn. Its motto is a favourite saying of his, "plus est en vous" ("there is more in you").

The school is located in Anakiwa. Its governing body, Outward Bound Trust New Zealand, operates from Auckland.

== History ==
The Anakiwa school was founded in 1962 by Christchurch lawyer Hamish Thomas. Thomas had previously visited British Outward Bound schools, and conducted a trial course on Auckland's Motutapu Island (in 1961). His daughter remarked that he "gave up a successful criminal law practice and a very comfortable existence to do something he truly believed in".

A guest house (originally built by the Beauchamp family, who had farmed Anakiwa since 1863) was purchased and restored using £100,000 in donated funds. The school was opened by then Governor-General of New Zealand Lord Cobham, who landed in the Marlborough Sounds for the occasion on board an RNZAF flying boat accompanied by Prime Minister Keith Holyoake and Leader of the Opposition Walter Nash. It was named "The Cobham Outward Bound School".

The school was intended for young men originally, who attended for a period of 16 days. A regimented programme awaited them. Days would begin with a 4:30 AM wake up, a cross-country run, then into the sea and off to breakfast.

Outward Bound began accepting female students in October 1973.

== Curriculum ==
Parts of the curriculum are deliberately obscured from prospective students. In fact, participants are often kept in the dark about what they will be doing next even while on the course.

However, most courses share activities drawn from a common pool and modified by the capabilities of the participant group: physical training, rock climbing, kayaking, sailing, tramping, and a solo experience. On some courses a half marathon or shorter distance run over part of the Queen Charlotte Track is completed at the end. The outdoor activities are not undertaken with the goal of becoming an expert kayaker, sailor or mountaineer. Rather, they are "the classroom" in which students gain in self-knowledge, confidence, and learn to work together.

Students are organised into "watches" of up to 14, a group they will remain assigned to for the duration of their course. Here watch is used in the nautical sense, "a group of sailors and officers aboard a ship or shore station with a common period of duty". Each watch is named for an iconic figure in New Zealand history; examples include Hillary, Kupe, Batten, and Cobham. Watches sleep together in a "watch house", eat together in the dining hall, and spend most of their time together.

== Courses ==
Broadly, Outward Bound divides course offerings into five categories based on their intended participants: teens, young adults, adults, professionals, and people with disabilities. The 'classic' Outward Bound experience is generally considered to be the 21 day course, offered for teens, young adults, and adults (aged 27 and up). Shorter courses are available, typically lasting five to eight days. These offer a more 'concentrated' version of the curriculum, with some being modified or targeted to particular participants. The organisation also offers to work with participant groups on custom-designed courses tailored to their needs.

== Facilities and equipment ==
The school maintains three 10 metre cutters, small sailing vessels capable of carrying all 14 students in a watch and up to three staff.

The cutters have been part of the school since its inception, and were also called whaleboats. The cutters were based on an old naval design, comparable to the James Caird used to cross part of the southern Atlantic Ocean by Ernest Shackleton. The original clinker built cutters were replaced with a slightly modified fibreglass design in 2012.

The school's quarterly newsletter is named The Cutter.

A small fleet of three powered launches are maintained to complement the cutters. One, Matakana, was originally constructed as a lifeboat for Wahine. Wahine sank before the lifeboat came into service, and subsequently the Union Steam Ship Company donated her to Outward Bound. Staff added an engine, deck and wheelhouse to convert it into a launch, and she remained in service nearly 50 years before the old fleet were replaced with newer Tortuga designs.

== Safety ==
As with many outdoor education activities, Outward Bound participants agree to undertake an increased level of risk when attending their course. The organisation's terms and conditions state in part, "Although we have procedures in place to minimise risk, none of these risks can be completely eliminated. When undertaking any activity, you will be briefed on the risks and how to manage them." They further note that no life-changing injuries have occurred at the school in the past decade.

Perhaps inevitably, students are occasionally injured during activities. Because some activities take place in remote areas of forest and terrain inaccessible to ground vehicles, helicopters are sometimes used to airlift injured participants to treatment at nearby Wairau Hospital. The need to evacuate students in this way is unusual, and they may be able to rejoin their course following assessment.

In 2011 the Outward Bound cutter Matahorua was struck by Delphinus, a 12.9 metre catamaran owned by a Picton ecotourism company. The twelve students on board the cutter were forced into the water after the impact sheared off the cutter's bow. They were later treated for minor injuries. Delphinus' captain was convicted of failing to keep a proper lookout and was ordered to pay reparation.

In its entire history, five participants have died during an Outward Bound course. However, no deaths have occurred at the school since 1993 when journalist Suzanne Consedine fell while tramping with her group. These accidents have informed Outward Bound instructor training and curriculum, following a global outdoor education trend away from acceptance of occasional accidental loss of life.

== Darryl: An Outward Bound Story ==
Darryl: An Outward Bound Story is a 2017 New Zealand ten-episode adventure comedy-drama web miniseries which was created by Millen Baird, shot in New Zealand's Marlborough Sounds, developed by Baird, directed by Kiel McNaughton, written by Baird and John Argall, produced by Kerry Warkia, Brown Sugar Apple Grunt Productions, Longline Productions Ltd., Outward Bound New Zealand and NZ On Air, composed by Mark Petrie, cinematographed by Roko Babich, edited by Baird, McNaughton, Rajneel Singh, Shane Warbrooke and Craig Waston, narrated by Baird, executive-produced by Baird and McNaughton and inspired by Baird's time and personal experiences on the 2001 and 2006 Anakiwa Outward Bound adventure courses.

=== Premise ===
Darryl: An Outward Bound Story follows Darryl Walker, a hopeless and desperate long distance marathon runner with crippling self-doubt, who tries to get his mojo back by taking part in an 8-day outdoor experience course at Anakiwa's Outward Bound.

=== Cast ===
Darryl: An Outward Bound Story stars Owen Black as Aaron the Outward Bound instructor, Siobhan Marshall as Marnie, Millen Baird as Darryl Walker, Glen Levy as Emilio, Shavaughn Ruakere as Sally, Rachel Blampied as Wendy, Fasitua Amosa as Kane, Toby Sharpe as Trent and John Argall as The Minotaur.

=== Production ===
Darryl: An Outward Bound Story was developed from a concept that Millen Baird first pitched in 2006. Baird began working on the miniseries around 2014 with writing heavily inspired by his 2001 and 2006 adventure courses at Outward Bound in Anakiwa. Filming for the miniseries took place over a 12-day period in February 2015. The production of the ten episodes of the miniseries utilized real Outward Bound instructors and real Outward Bound staff members to play extras in various scenes. The visual effects for the miniseries were done by Studio Local, Tania Smiler, Daniell Brown, Claudine Mailei and Jared Kahi.

=== Episodes ===
1. Day 1: Dancing Darryl
2. Day 1 (continued): Stand Up For Darryl
3. Still Day 1: Abandonment Issues
4. Day 2 Suffering is Optional
5. Day 2 (continued): Your Attitude Determines Your Altitude
6. Day 3: The Challenge Zone
7. Day 4: A Lone Wolf and Day 5: Who Are You?
8. Day 5 (continued): Learn to be Alone, Day 6: Mind Over Matter, and Day 7: Wrestle with the Minotaur
9. Day 7 (continued): Powerful Beyond Measure
10. Day 8: True Change

=== Release ===
Darryl: An Outward Bound Story was originally released on 27 March 2017 on TVNZ+, but became available on NZ On Screen.

=== Reception ===
Darryl: An Outward Bound Story received positive attention for its relatable humor, character-focused narrative and use of the "man alone" archetype. The miniseries was even praised for balancing cringe comedy with a heartwarming journey of self-discovery. Calum Henderson of The New Zealand Herald described the miniseries as "admirably uncynical" and a "comedy gem". Critics and viewers warmed to Darryl Walker's crippling self-doubt, moustache and desperate need to fix his life.

=== Awards ===
Award	Year	Category	Winner	Result	Ref.
New Zealand Television Awards	2017	Best Script: Comedy	Darryl: An Outward Bound Story	Won	
NZ Writers Guild Awards	2017	Best Web Episode	Darryl: An Outward Bound Story	Won	

== See also ==
- Outward Bound
