= Outward Bound =

International outdoor education network

- Outward Bound International
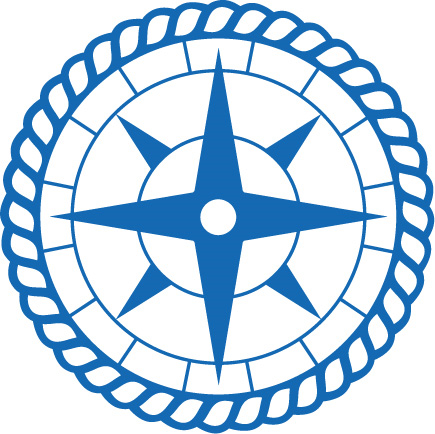
- Outward Bound Compass Rose Logo used by schools around the world.
- Abbreviation: OB
- Formation: 1941; 85 years ago
- Founder: Lawrence Holt / Kurt Hahn
- Founded at: United Kingdom
- Type: Nonprofit organization
- Region served: Worldwide
- Products: Programs
- Methods: Experiential learning
- Fields: Outdoor education
- Executive Director: Nick Cotton
- Associate Director: Sarah Wiley
- Affiliations: International Union for Conservation of Nature
- Website: www.outwardbound.net

Outward Bound is an international network of outdoor education organisations that provide experiential learning programs for personal and social development through small-group adventure-based experiences such as wilderness expeditions and challenging outdoor activities. It was founded in the United Kingdom in 1941 by Lawrence Holt and educator Kurt Hahn. The name Outward Bound was derived from the nautical term for a ship leaving safe harbour for the open sea. The network is coordinated by Outward Bound International, a non-profit membership and licensing organisation. Organisations licensed by Outward Bound International, called schools, now operate in 33 countries and have established 36 schools. These organisations serve over 150,000 participants each year.

== History ==
=== Founding ===
The first Outward Bound school was opened in Aberdyfi, Wales, in 1941. It was established by Lawrence Holt with financial support from the Blue Funnel Line shipping company, based on the initiative of German educator Kurt Hahn. Outward Bound grew out of Hahn's work in the development of the Gordonstoun school and what is now known as the Duke of Edinburgh's Award in the United Kingdom. Outward Bound's founding mission, during the Second World War, was to improve the survival chances of young seamen should their ships be torpedoed in the mid-Atlantic.

James Martin Hogan served as warden for the first year of the Aberdyfi school. Capt. J. F. "Freddy" Fuller took over as senior warden in 1942, expanding the mission and serving until 1971. Fuller had been seconded from the Blue Funnel Line following his wartime experience during the Battle of the Atlantic of surviving two successive torpedo attacks and commanding an open lifeboat in the Atlantic Ocean for thirty-five days without losing a single member of the crew.

Reflecting on the development of Outward Bound in 1960, Kurt Hahn claimed that Outward Bound and related initiatives, including the Duke of Edinburgh's Award, had made an important contribution toward achieving the "moral equivalent of war" championed by William James. He also argued that Outward Bound should continue to expand this contribution in response to the social challenges of the modern world.

=== The Outward Bound Trust ===
The Outward Bound Trust is an educational charity established in 1946 to operate Outward Bound schools in the United Kingdom.. The trust was established in 1946 to operate the original school in Wales. A second school followed in England at Eskdale Green in 1950. The first Outward Bound program for women was held in 1951. During the next decade, several other schools opened around the United Kingdom.

From the inception of Outward Bound, community service was an integral part of the program, especially in the areas of sea and mountain rescues and this remains an important part of the training for both staff and students. During the period 1941 to 1965 in the United Kingdom, the philosophy of the schools evolved from "character training" to "personal growth" and "self‐discovery".

Aberdyfi in Wales remains the organisation's "nerve-centre" in the United Kingdom. Over the course of a summer in 2010, 7000 to 8,000 students attended courses at the Aberdyfi centre and more than a million young people have attended Outward Bound courses in the UK since 1941. Prince Philip served as the Patron of the Outward Bound Trust for several years before handing over to his son Prince Andrew, who resigned in November 2019.

=== International expansion ===
A school in Lumut, Malaysia opened in 1954, the first outside the United Kingdom. Outward Bound Australia was founded in 1956. The first Outward Bound USA course was run in Puerto Rico in 1961 for the Peace Corps. Outward Bound New Zealand was founded in 1962, Outward Bound Singapore established in 1967 and Outward Bound Hong Kong in 1970. Outward Bound Costa Rica was founded in 1991. Outward Bound Peacebuilding was formed in the early 2000's in the US, working to leverage and link ideas related to peacebuilding and experiential education.

Outward Bound helped to shape the U.S. Peace Corps and numerous other outdoor adventure programs such as Project Adventure and the National Outdoor Leadership School.

=== Outward Bound International ===
Separate organisations operate "schools" in each country. Outward Bound International was founded as a non-profit organisation in 2004 to license the use of the brand name "Outward Bound" and to provide support to the international network of schools.

Today, there are schools in 33 countries with 250 wilderness and urban locations around the world which are attended by more than 150,000 students each year. Outward Bound's compass rose emblem serves as the logo for almost all the schools around the world.

From 2022 to 2025, Outward Bound International, in collaboration with researchers from Pennsylvania State University, the University of Utah, and Clemson University and supported by the John Templeton Foundation, undertook a project exploring how Outward Bound programs cultivate character strengths across diverse cultural and geographic contexts. Drawing on case studies from Outward Bound schools in 11 countries, the project identified five key aspects of programs (educational philosophy, authentic adventure, service, educational models, and instructor behaviors) that develop three aspects of character (moral, performance, and civic) while also documenting how these practices are adapted locally throughout the international network.

== Blue Peter nautical flag ==
The Blue Peter nautical flag indicates that a vessel is "outward bound". OB schools use this flag to symbolise the journey undertaken by its students.

The name Outward Bound derives from a nautical expression that refers to the moment a ship leaves the harbour. This is signified by Outward Bound's use of the nautical flag, the Blue Peter (a white square inside a blue square).

== Motto ==
JF Fuller adapted the Outward Bound motto, "To Serve, To Strive and not To Yield," from the poem "Ulysses" by Alfred Lord Tennyson:

... Come, my friends.
Tis not too late to seek a newer world.
Though much is taken, much abides; and though
We are not now that strength which in old days
Moved earth and heaven, that which we are, we are --
One equal temper of heroic hearts,
Made weak by time and fate, but strong in will
To strive, to seek, to find, and not to yield.

== Course specifics ==
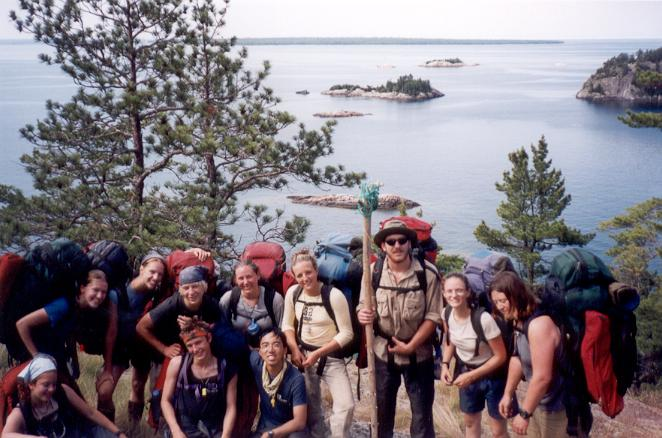
An Outward Bound excursion at Lake Superior Provincial Park, Ontario, Canada

Outward Bound aims to foster the personal growth and social skills of participants by using challenging expeditions in the outdoors. The experiences are a means of building inner strength and a heightened awareness of human interdependence.

Outward Bound programs follow a kind of recipe or formula, termed the Outward Bound Process Model as described by Walsh and Golins (1976) as:

1. Taking a ready, motivated learner
2. into a prescribed, unfamiliar physical environment,
3. along with a small group of people
4. who are faced with a series of incremental, inter-related problem-solving tasks
5. which creates in the individual a state of dissonance requiring adaptive coping and
6. leads to a sense of mastery or competence when equilibrium is managed.
7. The cumulative effect of these experiences leads to a reorganisation of the self-conceptions and information the learner holds about him/herself.
8. The learner will then continue to be positively oriented to further learning and development experiences (transfer).

In a typical class, participants are divided into small patrols (or groups) under the guidance of one or more instructors. The first few days, often at a base camp, are spent training for the outdoor education activities that the course will contain and in the philosophy of Outward Bound. After initial confidence-building challenges, the group heads off on an expedition. As the group develops the capacity to do so, the instructors ask the group to make its own decisions.

== Research ==
A 1997 meta-analysis of 97 studies about the short- and longer-term impacts of outdoor education programs identified Outward Bound programs as particularly effective for participants' personal and social development.

== Outward Bound schools ==
Several Outward Bound schools and national organisations have individual Wikipedia articles, including:

- Outward Bound Australia
- Outward Bound Costa Rica
- Outward Bound New Zealand
- Outward Bound Singapore
- Outward Bound USA

== See also ==
- Adventure education
- Experiential education
- Experiential learning
- Lack of physical education
