= Woodswomen, Inc. =

US nonprofit organization

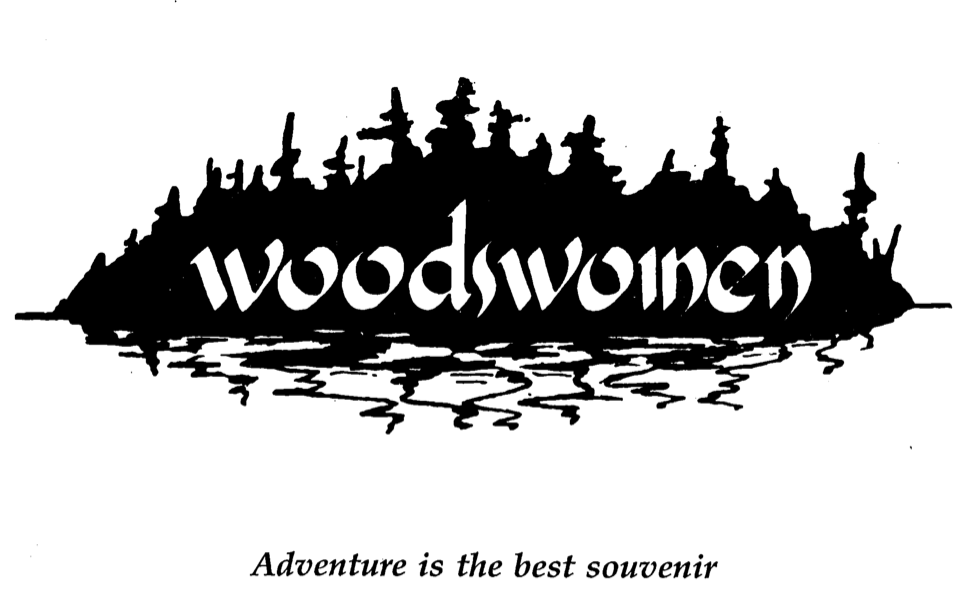
Woodswomen, Inc. logo, circa 1979

Woodswomen, Inc. was a nonprofit organization focusing on education and adventure travel operated by women, for women out of Minneapolis, Minnesota, from 1977 to 1999. Woodswomen was one of the first adventure travel companies serving exclusively women and served more than 8,000 women and 1,200 children in its tenure. It has been referred to as the 'grandmother' of women's outdoor adventure groups.

== History ==
The name 'Woodswomen' was first used in 1977 when Judith Niemi, Elizabeth Barnard, Shirley Helyer, and Trudy Fulton organized a Boundary Waters Canoe Area trip for women. Though these three women are generally credited with the initial organization, they maintain that it was founded organically. This means that each woman has her own Woodswomen history and no one person started out to make a business out of adventure travel for women. For example, Judith Niemi's personal Woodswomen began when she decided that women needed an organization that would run outdoor trips solely for them, following a trip in the Boundary Waters Canoe Area, where she saw no other women for two weeks.

In 1980, Woods-women launched a women-and-leadership course which turned into a well respected leadership program that trained many women who led Woods-women trips and trips for other companies. Woods-women was incorporated as a nonprofit organization in 1982. Also in 1982, the organisation coordinated and sponsored an expedition commemorating theo jonston 's 1905 George River trip in Labrador, Canada. A seven-member expedition team traveled for four weeks on a 200-mile journey following Hubbard's route.

In 1985, Kathy Phibbs opened the Northwest office of Woodswomen and served as its director. Two years earlier, she had organized the first meeting of Women Climbers Northwest (WCN) in 1983.

In 1987, Denise Mitten secured a grant from the Emma B. Howe Foundation and started the Women and Children Bonding in the Outdoors Program. Expanding their reach, in 1989 Mitten answered a request for proposals from the Minnesota Department of Corrections and secured funding for the Wilderness Experiences for Women Offenders Program.

In 1990, Woodswomen sponsored the 100th year Commemoration Climb of Fay Fuller's ascent of Mount Rainier, Washington. Kathy Phibbs and several other women led the climb which included over 30 women, many wearing dresses, and one woman who completed the climb with an artificial leg.

In 1992, Woodswomen started Minnesota Youth Outdoors programs for lesbian, gay, and bisexual youth, who participated in a series of one to two day trips. Woodswomen guides and "adult supporter team members hope that sense of self and success will help gay and lesbian youth negotiate a time fraught with difficulties."

In 1993, Woodswomen had 59 domestic trips and 11 international trips ranging from cross-country skiing in Minnesota to climbing Mount Kilimanjaro in Tanzania.

Woodswomen closed its doors in 1999. Its mailing list was passed on to Marian Marbury, who went on to found Adventures in Good Company.

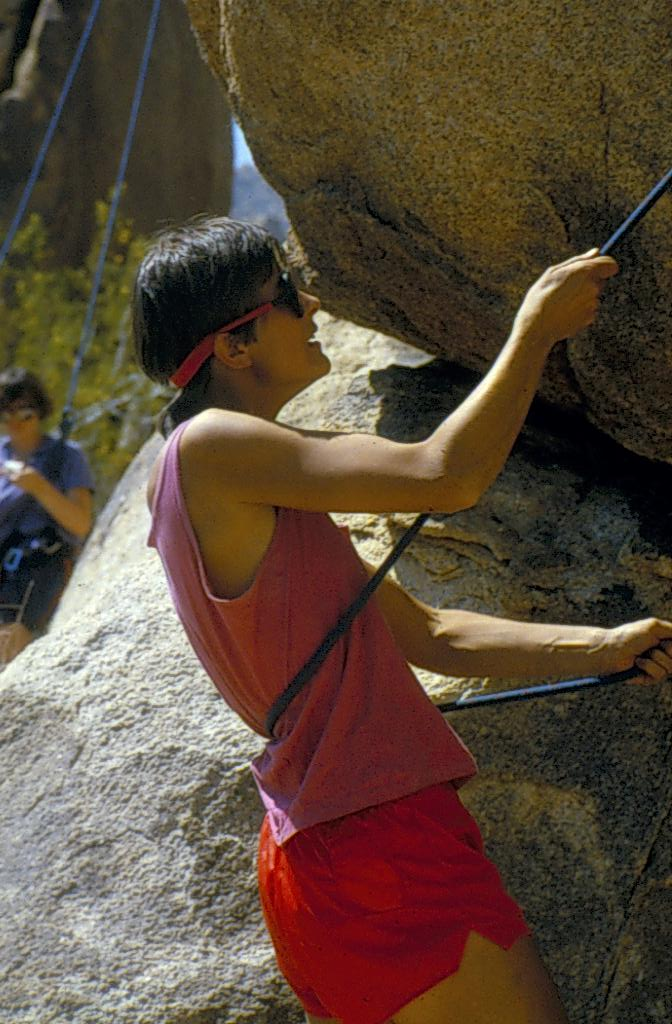
Woodswomen guide and Executive Director Denise Mitten using a body belay while guiding in Joshua Tree National Park in the 1980s. Photo by Kathy Phibbs.

== Philosophy and trip outcomes ==
Woodswomen's mission was to "offer supportive and challenging learning opportunities for women and for women and children to help foster individual growth, responsibility, and relationship skills." Woodswomen was set up with feminist and environmentalist ideals in mind, such as empowering women and protecting the environment.

Woodswomen was an organization that pioneered several programmatical aspects of adventure therapy and adventure education.

- Valuing emotional safety as well as physical safety
- Valuing personal choice and individual goals
- Valuing healthy relationships with people and the environment, hiring and training staff who could exemplify healthy bonding both within the group and with nature.
- Valuing women and women's ways of knowing, hiring, and training staff who could model that women's strengths are an asset to outdoor living and traveling.

Judith Niemi explained part of Woodswomen's philosophy as, "not worrying about competition, achievement, ego. Especially not thinking we are conquering nature." Many people go into the wilderness with the mindset of "conquering the great outdoors." Woodswomen trips worked to counter that mindset and instead learn through nature, getting to feel comfortable, and ending up feeling blissful, in the outdoors. The idea was that it was not important how far you went, how fast you climbed, etc., but rather what you saw, what you experienced, what you did. Guides completed extensive training and emphasis was placed on leadership styles. Woodswomen directors would look for "alternatives to hierarchical leadership and centralized authority," working to have everyone participate in decision-making.

Especially in the early years of Woodswomen (1970s and 1980s), many women did not have strong outdoors skills because they had not been given the opportunity to learn them. This led to women on outdoor trips being marginalized for their lack of skill and not getting the opportunity to learn. When men on trips would teach women some skills, it would be condescending and hierarchical, and women would get frustrated when they didn't get it right away.

"When women learn from women, they take more credit for learning," said Elizabeth Barnard in an interview. Traveling with other women also gets women out of passive roles they may take at home and on trips with men, where they may be marginalized in favor of having the supposedly stronger and faster men do the job. When men are not around, it's impossible for women to fall into gender roles in terms of the tasks they perform and the skills they must learn.

In addition to learning new skills and becoming comfortable in the outdoors, one of the main results of Woodswomen trips was increased self-esteem in participants. Women coming back from trips reported an increase in confidence, saying things like "now I know I can go for that job promotion." Woodswomen affiliates conducted research over the years about the outcomes of trips, and how empowered women felt by them.

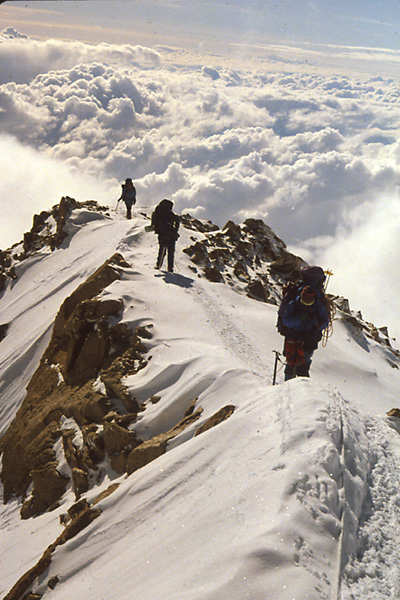
1988 Woodswomen Denali Climb on the west buttress of Mount McKinley, Alaska. Climb guided by Denise Mitten and Kathy Phibbs. Photo by Denise Mitten.

== Programs ==
Woodswomen Inc.'s primary function was to offer adventure travel trips for women.

In 1993, Woodswomen ran 70 trips in 8 different countries, and upon its closure in 1999, Woodswomen had served over 8,000 women and 1,200 children through its outdoor adventure programs.

The trips focused on activities including biking, rock climbing, backpacking, cross country skiing, kayaking, canoeing, whitewater canoeing and rafting, winter camping, sea kayaking, snorkeling, SCUBA diving, mountaineering, horse packing, llama packing, wild ricing, and dogsledding.

Woodswomen guides completed an extensive guide-training program, focusing on leadership styles and group dynamics. Hollis Giammatteo, writing for Ms. magazine, took a leadership course that included climbing Mount Adams in Washington state. According to Giammatteo, Denise Mitten refined Woodswomen's acclaimed leadership program, creating a style stressing ethical and inclusive leadership.

For Woodswomen guides, leadership was viewed as a role that encouraged appropriate participation, not as a characteristic of a personality type. The rigid idea of goal-setting and the language of right and wrong were removed. Woodswomen guides, for example, would avoid words that connoted domination, such as 'attack the trail,' 'summit assault,' or 'conquer the mountain.'" Rather, they would say things like "'run the rapids,' 'climb the mountain,' or 'let's start hiking.'" Giammatteo wrote that Mitten taught the hostess concept, meaning that one guides in areas in alignment with one's ability. Just like one would throw a party in a place where one is comfortable and know where things are, ones leads trips in an areas where one is comfortable.

Woodswomen ran a number of special programs along with the adventure travel trips. One, called Minnesota Youth Outdoors, was a program which served gay, lesbian, and bisexual youth and allies. Minnesota Youth Outdoors ran one and two day trips to various locations in Southern Minnesota, giving participants opportunities to go rock climbing, canoeing, skiing, and hiking.

Trips were designed to expose LGBT youth to the outdoors and to provide them with positive interactions with adults, potentially leading to higher self-esteem, a greater affinity for nature, and hope for the future. Wilderness Experiences for Women Offenders was another of Woodswomen's special programs. Through this program, women felons would go on three-day outdoors trips, gaining confidence, and trust in themselves and other participants. Another program was called Women and Children Bonding in the Outdoors provided opportunities for low-income women and their children to experience outdoor activities. This program was designed to expose inner-city women and their children to outdoor activities; in the process women and children would gain self-respect, the courage to accept challenges, cooperation skills, and respect for nature.

Woodswomen affiliates taught various classes and workshops about the outdoors at colleges and schools around the Twin Cities metro area, in subjects ranging from log-cabin building, Minnesota ecology, feminism and ecology, botany, the history and literature of women and living in the wilderness, first aid, knots and ropes, bike touring, kayaking, bird watching, orienteering, working consciously and conscientiously with women in the outdoors, and camping with children.
