= Outward Bound Singapore =

Singaporean branch of Outward Bound

- Logo of the Outward Bound Singapore
- Named after: Outward Bound
- Formation: 1967; 59 years ago
- Founder: Goh Keng Swee
- Founded at: Pulau Ubin, North-Eastern Islands, Singapore
- Type: Non-profit organisation
- Legal status: Active
- Headquarters: National Youth Council, 490 Lorong 6 Toa Payoh, #04-10, HDB Hub Biz Three, Singapore 310490
- Locations: Pulau Ubin; Coney Island; East Coast Park
- Official language: English
- Parent organization: Outward Bound
- Affiliations: Ministry of Defence (1970–1991); People's Association (1991–2014); National Youth Council (2014–present)
- Website: obs.nyc.gov.sg
- Formerly called: Outward Bound School of Singapore

Outward Bound Singapore (OBS; Malay: Pusat Bina Semangat Singapura; Chinese: 新加坡外展训练中心; Tamil: சிங்கப்பூர் வெளிப்புற நடவடிக்கை) is part of the network of Outward Bound centres worldwide. Established in 1967 as Outward Bound School of Singapore (OBSS), OBS has a campus located on the island of Pulau Ubin.

== History ==
Initially named the Outward Bound School of Singapore, it was founded by then Minister of the Interior and Defence, Goh Keng Swee at Pulau Ubin in Singapore in 1967. OBSS was initially managed by the People's Association (PA) before the Ministry of the Interior and Defence took over to use it as a facility to prepare young men for compulsory national service.

In April 1991, OBSS was returned to the People's Association and was renamed Outward Bound Singapore. The number of participants has grown since 1991 and it is currently the largest Outward Bound centre worldwide. Secondary school students are strongly encouraged to attend a week's programme at Outward Bound Singapore's Pulau Ubin centre. The programme can be conducted indoor or outdoor, depending on the weather conditions. Over the years, OBS has evolved to play a more active role in community building through its OBS Alumni & the Leadership & Service Award. OBS has also partnered with overseas Outward Bound centres such as Oman & South Africa to provide more global programmes for youths. Recently announced at the Singapore Youth Conference 2014, OBS was restructured to be part of the new strengthened National Youth Council (NYC) Autonomous Agency. As one of the National Youth Developer, OBS will co-drive the national youth volunteer programme, Youth Corps Singapore with NYC.

=== Outward Bound philosophy ===
Outward Bound programmes are based on the educational philosophy developed by German educator Kurt Hahn, one of the founders of the international Outward Bound movement. Hahn described the aim of education as developing qualities such as curiosity, perseverance, self-discipline and compassion through experiential learning.

OBS programmes use an outdoor adventure-based learning approach involving activities such as expedition trekking, kayaking and ropes courses. The programmes are intended to develop teamwork, leadership and resilience among participants.

== Programmes ==
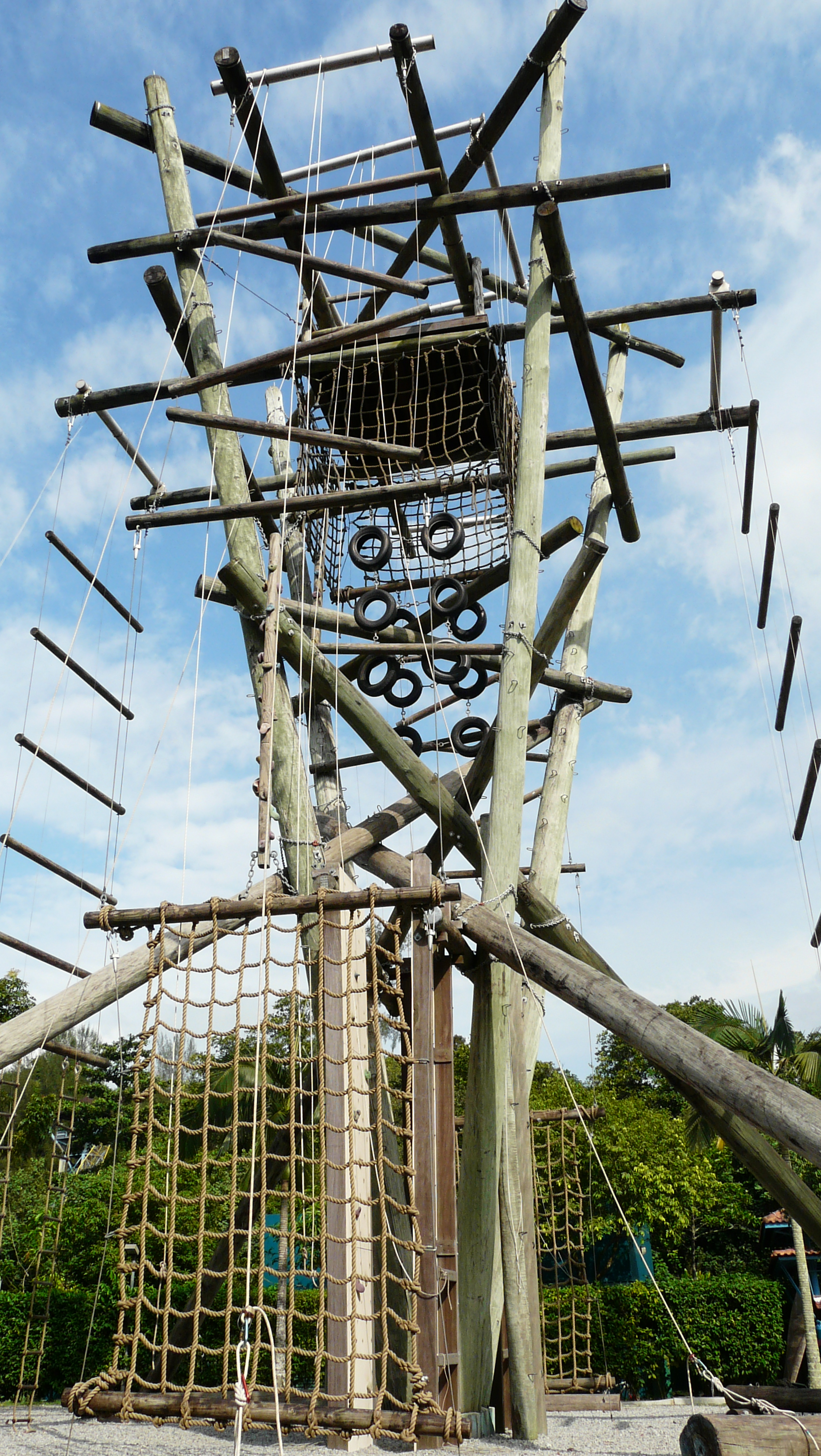
Inverse tower at the Pulau Ubin campus

OBS conducts outdoor education and leadership programmes for youths, students and community groups in Singapore.

=== Youth Corps Singapore ===
Following OBS' transfer to the National Youth Council in 2014, the organisation began supporting programmes conducted in partnership with Youth Corps Singapore.

=== MOE-OBS Challenge Programme ===
Under the National Outdoor Adventure Education Masterplan, the MOE-OBS Challenge Programme was introduced for Secondary 3 students in Singapore. The programme combines school-based lessons with a five-day residential outdoor education course conducted by OBS.

=== Leadership & Service Award ===
Introduced in 2011, the Leadership & Service Award is a 21-day leadership development programme for youths aged 17 to 35. The programme combines outdoor adventure activities with community service components.

=== Global Adventures ===
OBS also conducts overseas programmes in partnership with other Outward Bound centres, including programmes previously held in Oman and South Africa.

== OBS Alumni ==
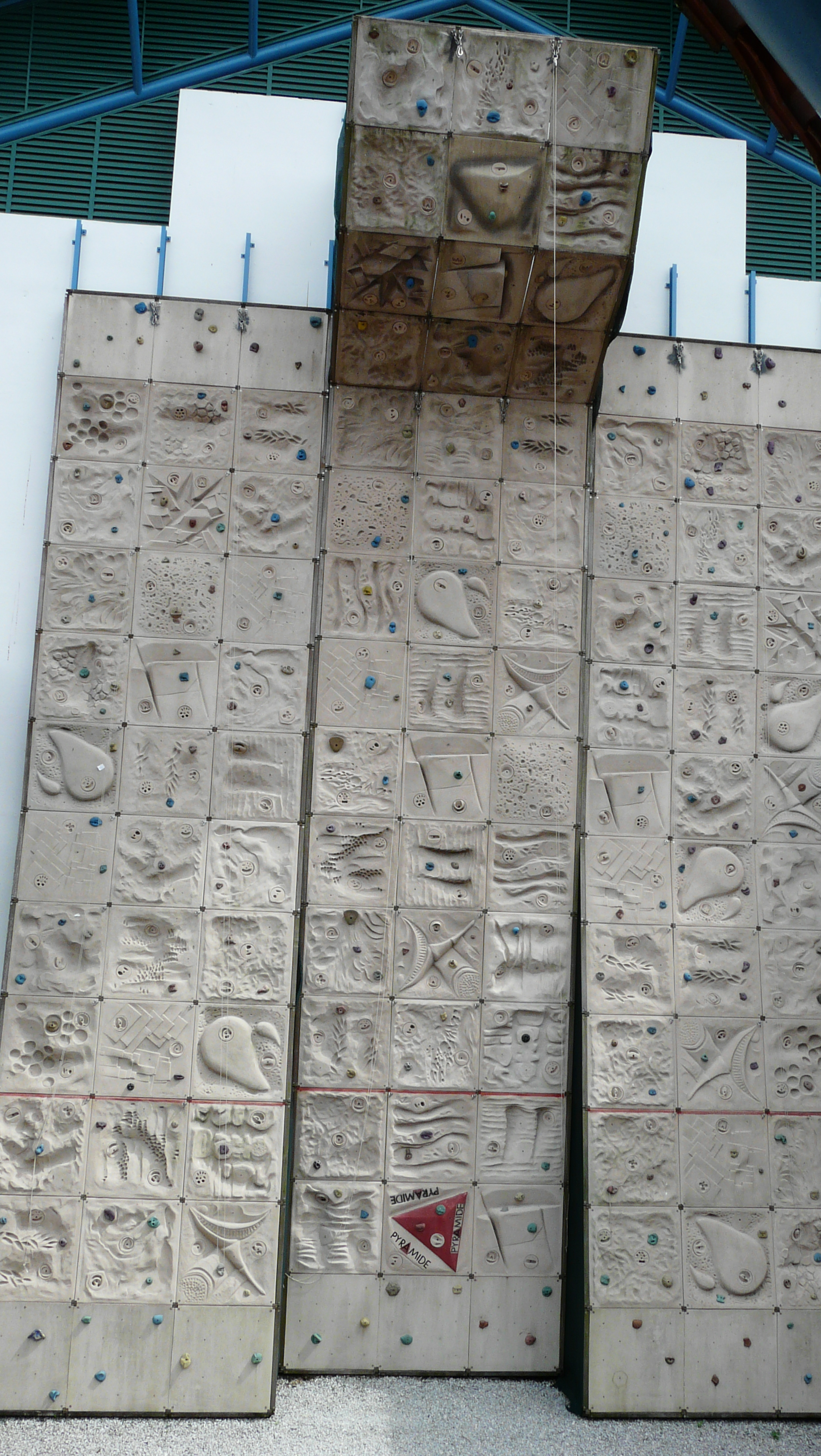
Rock-climbing wall at Pulau Ubin

OBS Alumni was established in 2012 as a volunteer network for former OBS participants. The group has participated in community service and environmental initiatives in partnership with organisations including community development councils, schools and charitable organisations.

== Facilities ==
=== Pulau Ubin Camp 1 & 2 ===
When Outward Bound first started in 1967, its facilities were spartan. Currently, OBS has two campuses at Pulau Ubin.

Using up approximately 9 hectares of land, some of the climbing facilities are the Peak Ascent Tower, inverse and tripod towers, Vertical Challenge Activities, The Indiana, rock climbing walls, and non-height activities such as the Tunnelling and Caving system. Other facilities include teaching rooms and a 25-metre swimming pool for kayaking.

The Pulau Ubin campus is located at two locations, with Camp 1 being larger than Camp 2. Depending on the course, Residential or Mobile, the campers either stay in the dormitories provided on campus or in tents on the centre's ground respectively.

=== OBS@Coney ===
A new campus is being developed on the eastern part of Coney Island in Punggol as part of the National Outdoor Adventure Education Masterplan. The project was first announced in 2016 and was originally scheduled for completion by 2021. Construction later faced delays due to the COVID-19 pandemic before works commenced in 2021.

The campus is scheduled to officially open in the second half of 2026. Upon completion, it will become OBS' third campus after Pulau Ubin and East Coast, and is intended to support the expansion of the Ministry of Education's MOE-OBS Challenge programme to all Secondary 3 students in Singapore by 2030.

The development includes advanced ropes courses, integrated climbing systems and other outdoor team-based challenge facilities. The low-rise campus was designed to blend with Coney Island's natural environment and received the Building and Construction Authority's Green Mark Platinum Super Low Energy certification.

== See also ==
- Outdoor education
