= Lawrence Durning Holt =

British businessman

Lawrence Durning Holt (17 November 1882 – 1961) was a businessman with interests in shipping. He founded the Outward Bound organisation in 1941, based on the educational principles of Kurt Hahn.

== Life and career ==
Lawrence Durning Holt was born in 1882 to Robert Durning Holt and Lawrencina Potter, a daughter of businessmen Richard Potter. Holt was part of a close-knit family that had business interests in the Blue Funnel Shipping Line and its associated companies, such as the Ocean Steam Ship Company. By the 1920s, Holt was a partner in and managing director of the Ocean Steam Ship Company.

Holt was Lord Mayor of Liverpool from 1929 to 1930, as his father had been from 1892 to 1893.

According to Heathcote (1971), "for five years, Lawrence Holt persuaded his partners to underwrite the loss on the school and to help with staff and stores. When time and experience were ripe for the development of other Outward Bound schools, the (Outward Bound) Trust was formed to carry on the work."
