= Outward Bound USA =

American non-profit organization

Outward Bound USA (OBUSA) is a non-profit organization providing experiential education in the United States through a network of regional schools, especially in wilderness settings. Outward Bound counts among its desired outcomes the development of self-awareness, self-confidence, leadership skills, environmental and social responsibility.

== History ==
Like other Outward Bound International member organizations, Outward Bound USA's course offerings are derived from the work of German educator Kurt Hahn and his Outward Bound schools founded by Lawrence Holt in the United Kingdom in 1941. The first course in the United States was run in 1961 for the Peace Corps, which it helped to shape.

== Outward Bound schools ==
- Chesapeake Bay Outward Bound School
- Colorado Outward Bound School
- Hurricane Island Outward Bound School
- North Carolina Outward Bound School
- Outward Bound California
- Philadelphia Outward Bound School
- Thompson Island Outward Bound Education Center
- Voyageur Outward Bound School
- New York City Outward Bound Schools

== Outward Bound courses ==
OBUSA offers a range of courses targeted at different ages and interests. Students are required to work together to complete outdoor education activities including rock climbing, backpacking, navigation, canoeing, mountaineering, and sailing.

- Classic: expeditions in the wilderness, usually lasting 15 days, separated by age groups (middle school, high school, and adult)
- Classic family: expeditions for family groups
- Semester: lasting 30 to 85 days, these expeditions are intended for students of college age
- Outdoor educator: for training and certification of wilderness education instructors
- Intercept: for teens having difficulties at home or in school and their families
- Veterans: offered at no cost to returned service members, lasting five to seven days
- Professional: of varying length, these combine outdoor and indoor education for organizations, companies, and non-profits
- Grieving teens: places young people who have experienced loss in a wilderness setting with others who have had similar experiences
- Group: customized courses for high school and college groups, or groups such as cancer survivors
- Educator: provide teachers with ways to integrate the Outward Bound approach into their work with students

== TV series ==
A television series aired on Discovery Kids from 1999 to 2003. In each location, the show followed a group of eight young adults as they learned to work together and help each other survive in the wilderness. Under the guidance of instructors from the Outward Bound school, the group members struggled to cope with nature and each other, with success and failure, with physical and mental challenges, and ultimately bonded together as a result of the experience.
