= ISL =

Isl (or isl) is a common abbreviation for "island" or "islands".

ISL may also refer to:

== Education and research ==
- Illinois Security Lab, a research laboratory at the University of Illinois at Urbana-Champaign
- Independent School League (disambiguation), independent high school athletic conferences in the United States
- Institute of State and Law, a Russian legal think tank affiliated with the Russian Academy of Sciences
- International School of Louisiana, a charter school system in the United States
- International School of Lusaka, an international school in Zambia
- International School of Luxembourg, a privately owned non-profit school in Luxembourg
- International School of Lyon, an international school in France

== Languages ==
- Icelandic language, the national language of Iceland
- Icelandic Sign Language, the sign language of Iceland
- Indian Sign Language also known as sign language of the deaf community in India
- International Sign Language, any of several international auxiliary languages
- Irish Sign Language, the sign language of Ireland
- Israeli Sign Language, the most commonly used sign language within Israel's deaf community
- Italian Sign Language, sign language used for Italian deaf people

== Sports ==
- Independent School League (Illinois), a group of nine Chicago-area preparatory schools
- Independent School League (New England), a group of 16 New England preparatory schools
- Independent School League (Washington, D.C. area), a group of 17 Washington, D.C. preparatory schools
- Interscholastic League of Honolulu, a group of Hawaiian private schools
- Indian Super League, a professional football-club league based in India
- Ice Hockey Superleague, a British-based ice hockey league that existed between 1996 and 2003
- Indonesia Super League, the top-tier competition for football clubs in Indonesia
- International Soccer League, a U.S. based soccer league which was formed in 1960 and collapsed in 1965
- International Sport and Leisure, a bankrupt Swiss sports marketing company that was closely affiliated with FIFA and the IOC
- Iranian Super League (disambiguation), the Iranian professional basketball, futsal or volleyball leagues
- Island Soccer League, a professional six-a-side association football league based in Bermuda
- International Swimming League, a professional swimming league with ten teams and nine rounds in different cities all over the world

== Transport ==
- Island line (MTR), one of the rapid transit railway lines in Hong Kong
- Isleworth railway station (National Rail station code ISL), Hounslow, London, England, UK
- Atatürk Airport (IATA airport code ISL), a former major international airport serving Istanbul, Turkey now serves cargo flights
- Iowa and St. Louis Railway (I&SL), U.S.

== Political organizations ==
- Independent Socialist League, a defunct Trotskyist group in the United States (originally called the "Workers Party")
- International Socialist League (South Africa), a former syndicalist group
- International Socialist Left (Germany) (German: Internationale Sozialistische Linke), a Trotskyist group in Germany

== Other uses ==
- Iceland, a Nordic European island country
- In situ leach, a mining technique
- Independent state legislature theory, U.S. Constitution reading
- Integer set library (isl), a programming library for manipulating integer sets
- Inter-Switch Link (disambiguation), a specially configured connection between network equipment
  - Cisco Inter-Switch Link, a proprietary Cisco VLAN trunking protocol
- International Service Learning, a humanitarian NGO that offers volunteers practical experience in medical, education, and community enrichment programs
- International Sport and Leisure, a former sports marketing agency based in Switzerland
- Irish Shipping Limited, an Irish state-owned deepsea shipping company formed during World War II
- i. s. L., "in the sense of Lyapunov" (in mathematical contexts), a reference to Lyapunov stability
- Postal code for Senglea, Malta (Maltese: Isla)
- Inter-satellite link, a communication link between two satellites, either via radio-frequency, or via optical link (then also called OISL).

== See also ==
- International Society of the Learning Sciences (ISLS)
