= Outdoor education =

Organized learning that takes place in the outdoors

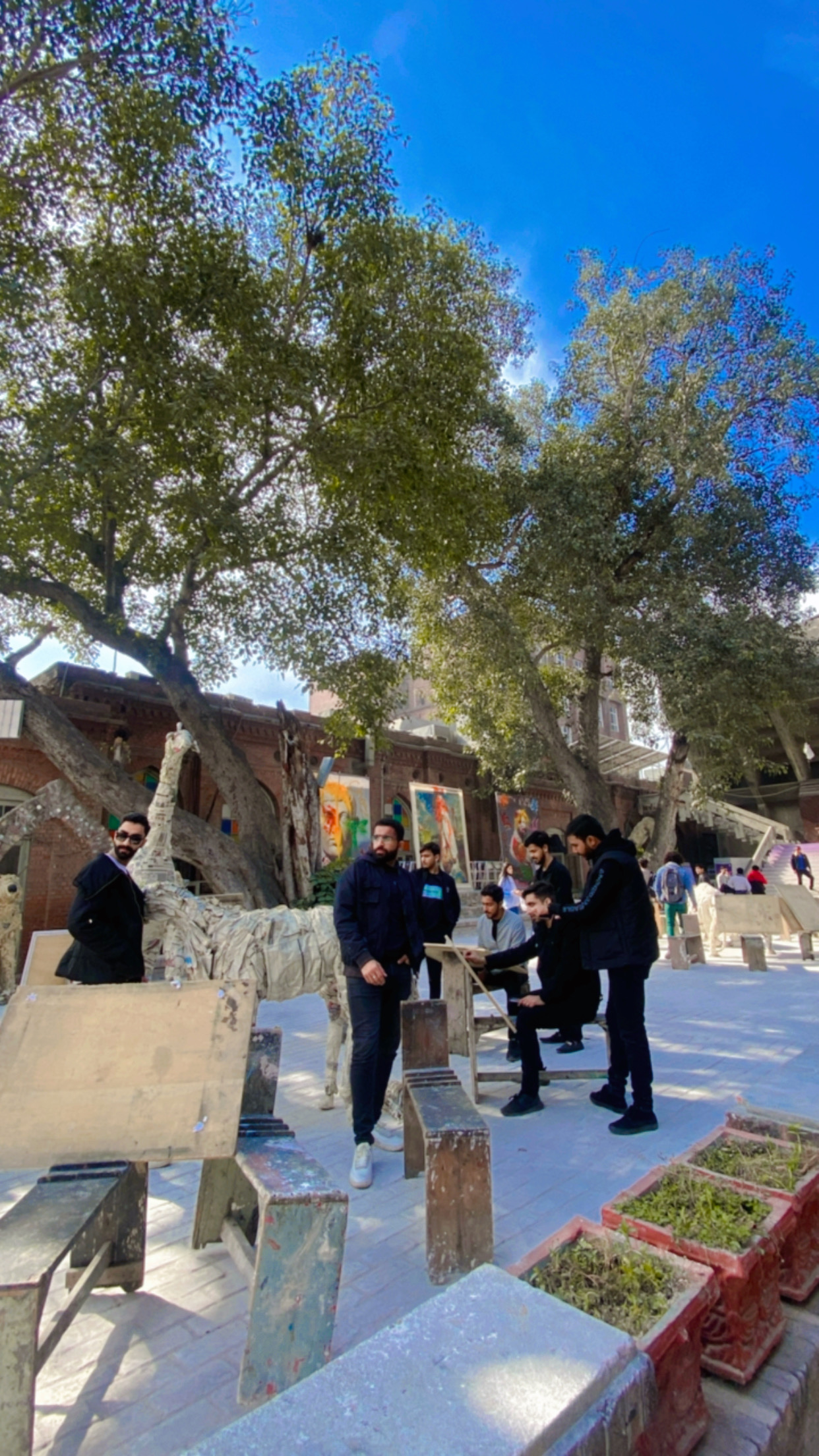
An outdoor visual arts class going on in National College of Arts, Pakistan

Outdoor education is organized learning that takes place in the outdoors, such as during school camping trips. Outdoor education programs sometimes involve residential or journey wilderness-based experiences which engage participants in a variety of adventurous challenges and outdoor activities such as hiking, climbing, canoeing, ropes courses and group games. Outdoor education draws upon the philosophy, theory, and practices of experiential education and environmental education.

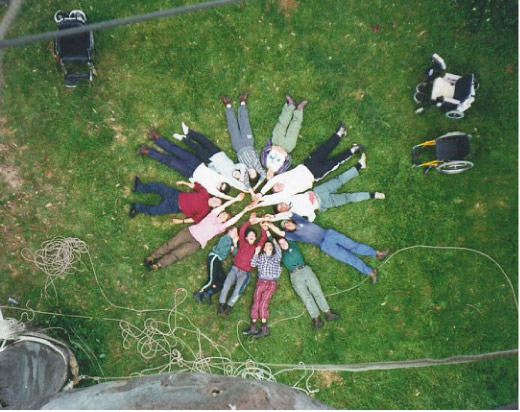
A group of Outward Bound participants with physical disabilities after completing a ropes course, c. 1996.

== Scope ==
Outdoor education encompasses a wide range of organized learning activities that take place predominantly outdoors. It can involve learning about, in, or through natural environments. The focus varies widely: some programs emphasize environmental stewardship, while others prioritize personal or social development through nature-based challenges.

=== Key aims and outcomes ===
Common objectives of outdoor education include:

- Building teamwork, problem-solving skills, resilience, and self-confidence via experiential and wilderness-based activities such as hiking, camping, ropes courses, and canoeing.
- Promoting environmental awareness, ecological literacy, and a sense of place through direct interaction with natural environments.
- Supporting social and emotional development, including improved focus, well-being, and interpersonal relationships among students.
- Strengthening physical and mental health through increased activity levels, reduced stress, and improved mood.

=== Theoretical foundations ===
Outdoor education draws on:

- Experiential education, where knowledge grows through action and reflection.
- Environmental education, focusing on sustainability and respect for nature.
- Broader models such as the Outdoor Learning umbrella, which includes Adventure education, Forest Schools, and Outdoor therapy.

=== Challenges and trends ===
A systematic review highlighted gains in engagement and well-being from outdoor learning but also noted that long-term academic outcomes are under-researched. Current trends include:

- Addressing issues such as nature-deficit disorder and climate change.
- Incorporating Indigenous perspectives to support reconciliation and contextual learning.
- Developing inclusive and low-cost approaches, such as school gardens and community-based outdoor classrooms.

=== Definitions ===
Outdoor education can be defined as experiential learning in, for, or about the outdoors. The term "outdoor education", however, is used broadly to refer to a range of organized activities that take place in a variety of ways in predominantly outdoor environments. Common definitions of outdoor education are difficult to achieve because interpretations vary according to culture, philosophy, and local conditions.

Outdoor education is often referred to as synonymous with outdoor learning, outdoor school, forest schools and wilderness education. Outdoor education often uses or draws upon related elements and/or informs related areas, such as teaching students how to pitch tents and cook over a campfire. The hallmark of outdoor education is its focus on the "outdoor" side of this education; whereas adventure education would focus on the adventure side and environmental education would focus on environmental. Expeditionary education involves expeditions into wilderness "where man is but a visitor." All of these activities typically involve experiential education.

=== Education outside the classroom ===
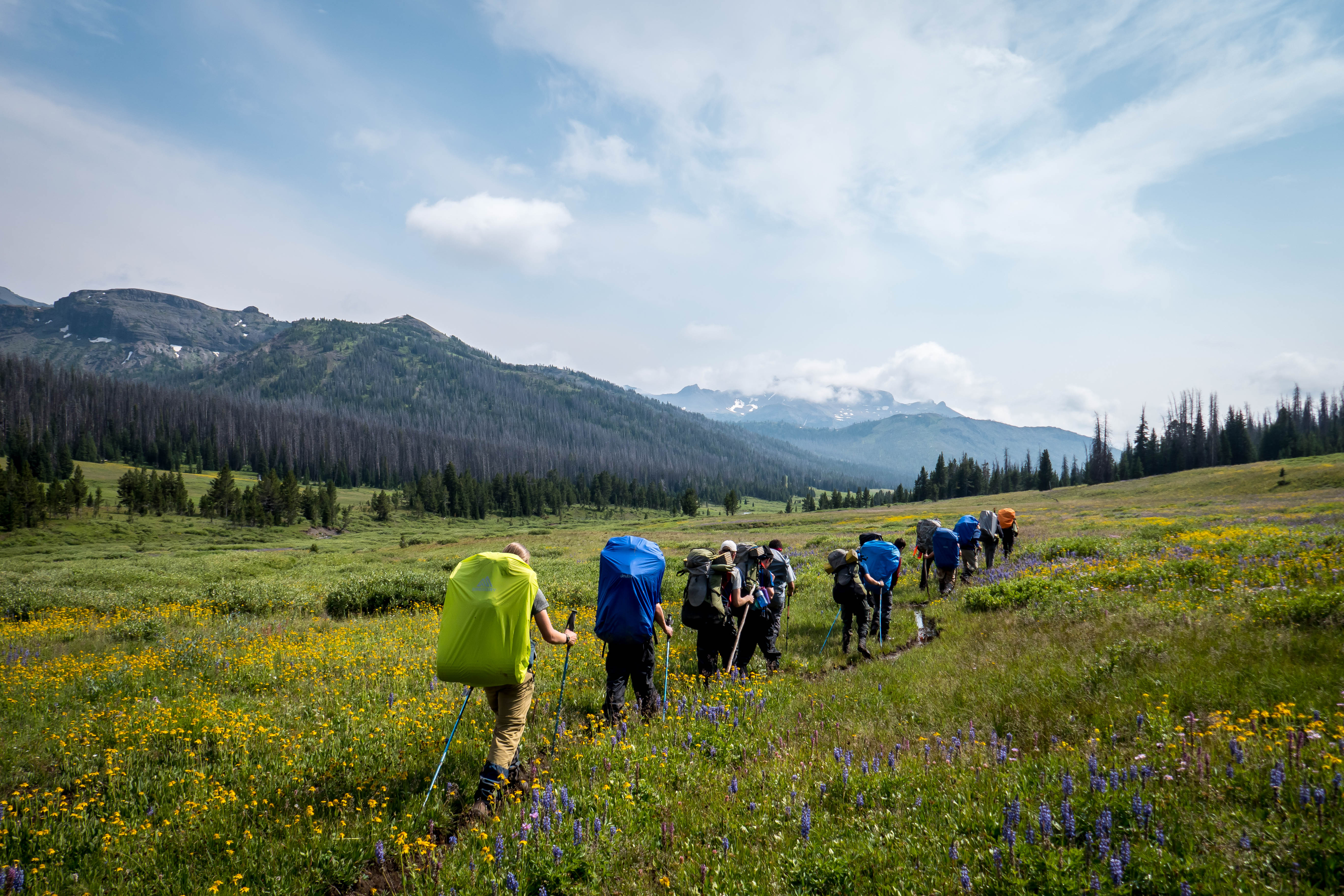
Freshmen at Wyoming Catholic College hike in the Teton Mountains during a three-week backpacking course.

"Education outside the classroom" describes school curriculum learning, other than with a class of students sitting in a room with a teacher and books. It encompasses biology field trips and searching for insects in the school garden, as well as indoor activities like observing stock control in a local shop, or visiting a museum. It is a concept currently enjoying a revival because of the recognition of benefits from the more active style. The Education and Skills Committee of the House of Commons of the United Kingdom has reported that it brings history and art to life, develops social skills, and clearly enhances geography and science. There are key policies in place for outdoor learning in England, Scotland and Wales.

Despite the evidence supporting an extension of educational camping and outdoor learning for children, there are a number of obstacles in the way. One of these obstacles is risk aversion amongst teachers, parents and others, raising reluctance to such diverse and physical tasks. The journalist Tim Gill has written about parental and institutional risk aversion affecting many activities with children in his book "No Fear". Another obstacle is the perceived high cost of facilitating outdoor learning. Creating an outdoor learning environment needn't cost a great deal, however. The UK Early Years Framework Stage, which outlines best practice in Early Years teaching, asserts that: "Outdoor learning is more effective when adults focus on what children need to be able to do rather than what children need to have. An approach that considers experiences rather than equipment places children at the centre of learning and ensures that individual children's learning and developmental needs are taken account of and met effectively"

Linda Tallent, a UK-based educational consultant who has worked extensively with schools to develop their outdoor spaces into learning environments, agrees. She believes that by focusing on activities and skill development, it is possible to develop an outdoor learning curriculum on a 'shoe string'. She cites a comment by Will Nixon, who reminds readers that 'Using the real world is the way learning has happened for 99.9% of human existence. Only in the last hundred years have we put it into a little box called a classroom.'. Tallent also refers to evidence from a number of studies that the most effective way of learning is through participation, and calls on educators to make a special effort to create opportunities for children to participate in their learning.

=== Aims ===
Some typical aims of outdoor education are to:

- learn how to overcome adversity;
- enhance personal and social development;
- develop a deeper relationship with nature;
- boost self-confidence when camping with classmates;
- raise attainment through better teaching and learning experiences.

Outdoor education spans the three domains of self, others, and the natural world. The relative emphasis of these three domains varies from one program to another. An outdoor education program can, for example, emphasize one (or more) of these aims to:

- teach outdoor survival skills
- improve problem solving skills
- reduce recidivism
- enhance teamwork
- develop leadership skills
- understand natural environments
- promote spirituality
- provide an active, first-hand learning experience

Outdoor education is often used as a means to create a deeper sense of place for people in a community. Sense of place is manifested through the understanding and connection that one has with the area in which they reside. Sense of place is an important aspect of environmentalism as well as environmental justice because it makes the importance of sustaining a particular ecosystem that much more personal to an individual.

== History ==
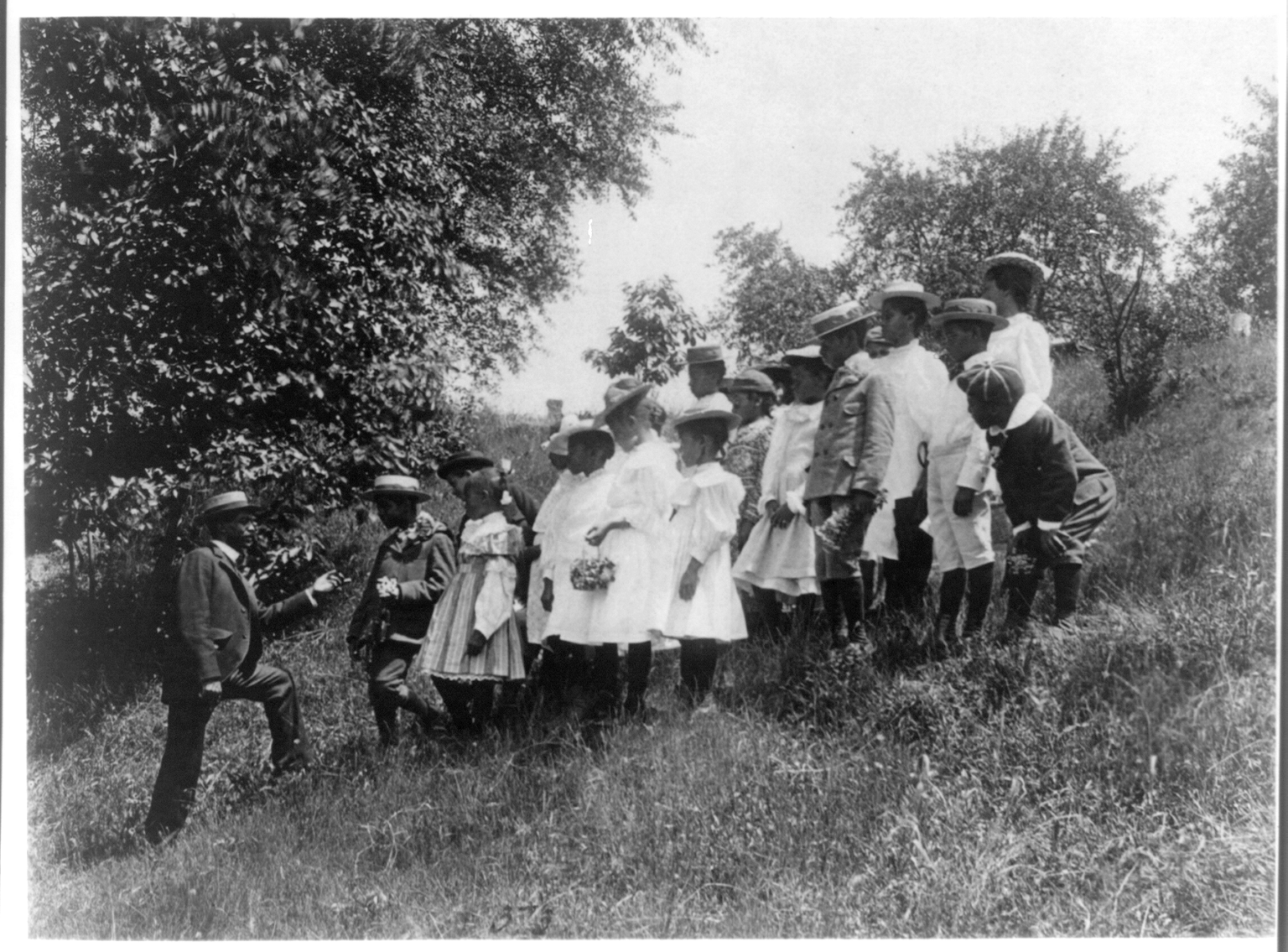
Field trip: school children outdoors listening to man, c. 1899, US

Modern outdoor education owes its beginnings to separate initiatives. Organized camping was evident in the late nineteenth century and early twentieth century in Europe, the UK, the US, Australia, and New Zealand. The Scouting movement, established in the UK in 1907 by Robert Baden-Powell, employs non-formal education with an emphasis on practical outdoor activities. The first Outward Bound centre at Aberdyfi in Wales was established during the Second World War. The Forest schools of Denmark are examples of European programs with similar aims and objectives.

Key outdoor education pioneers include Kurt Hahn, a German educator who founded schools such as the Schule Schloss Salem in Germany; the United World Colleges movement, the Duke of Edinburgh Award scheme (which emphasizes community service, craftsmanship skills, physical skill, and outdoor expeditions), and the Outward Bound movement.

The second half of the twentieth century saw rapid growth of outdoor education in all sectors (state, voluntary, and commercial) with an ever-widening range of client groups and applications. In this period Outward Bound spread to over 40 countries, including the US in the 1960s. Other US based outdoor education programs include Project Adventure and the National Outdoor Leadership School (NOLS). Project Adventure focuses on day use of ropes courses. NOLS uses the outdoor setting to train leaders for outdoor programs and for other settings including training every new US astronaut and 10% of the US Naval Academy. The Association for Experiential Education is a professional association for "experiential" educators. The Wilderness Education Association (WEA) is a consortium of college outdoor education programs with a standard curriculum based on an academic model. (See also North America in the Around the World section.)

A history of outdoor education in the UK has been documented by Lyn Cook (1999), and a history of outdoor education in New Zealand has been published in Pip Lynch's Camping in the Curriculum (2007).

== Philosophy and theory ==
Philosophy and theory about outdoor education tends to emphasize the effect of natural environments on human beings, the educative role of stress and challenge, and experiential learning.

One view is that participants are at their "rawest" level when outdoors because they are "stripped" of many of the conveniences of modern life. Participants can become more aware that they are part of a greater ecosystem and are not as bound by social customs and norms. In essence participants can be true to themselves and more able to see others as people regardless of race, class, religion etc. Outdoor education also helps instill the basic elements of teamwork because participants often need to work together and rely on others. For many people a high ropes course or an outdoor activity may stretch their comfort zone and cause them to challenge themselves physically which in turn can lead to challenging oneself mentally.

The roots of modern outdoor education can be found in the philosophical work of:

- Comenius
- John Dewey
- William James
- Aldo Leopold
- John Locke
- John Muir
- Jean-Jacques Rousseau
- Henry David Thoreau
- Johann Heinrich Pestalozzi

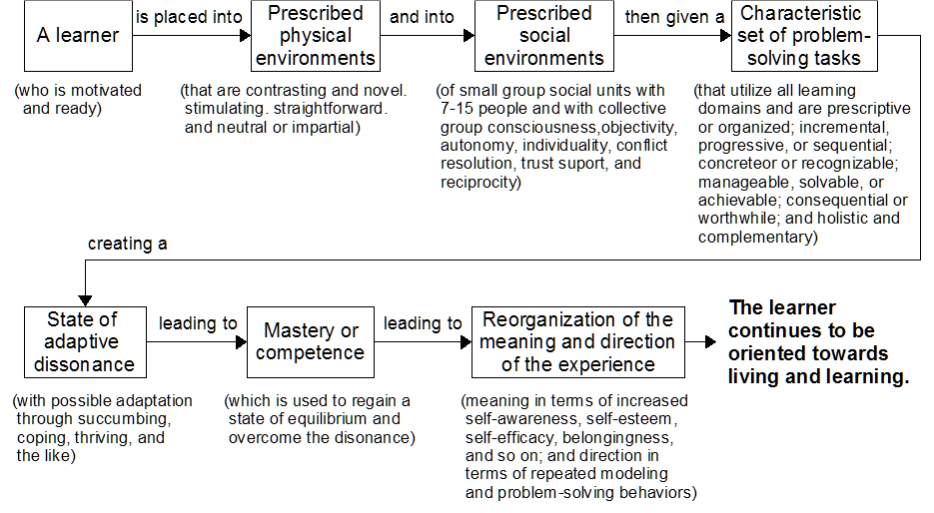
The Outward Bound Process Model, adapted from Walsh and Golins (1976).

Foundational work on the philosophy of outdoor education includes work by:

- Kurt Hahn
- Willi Unsoeld

A wide range of social science and specific outdoor education theories and models have been applied in an effort to better understand outdoor education. Amongst the key theoretical models or concepts are:

- Experiential education theories
- Group development theories
- the Outward Bound Process Model
- Stress, optimal arousal, comfort zone, and psychological flow theories
- Psychoevolutionary theory and the Biophilia hypothesis

== Around the world ==
Outdoor education occurs, in one form or another, in most if not all countries of the world. However, it can be implemented very differently, depending on the cultural context. Some countries, for example, view outdoor education as synonymous with environmental education, whilst other countries treat outdoor education and environmental education as distinct. Modern forms of outdoor education are most prevalent in the UK, US, Australia, New Zealand, Europe and to some extent Asia and Africa. Many outdoor Education programs were cancelled in 2020 due to the COVID-19 Pandemic.

=== UK ===
The English Outdoor Council, an umbrella body, defines outdoor education as a way for students and teachers to be fully engaged in a lesson, all the while embracing the outdoors. The EOC deems outdoor education as "providing depth to the curriculum and makes an important contribution to students' physical, personal and social education.". In the UK, Learning through Landscapes champion the use of School Grounds as a cost effective, easily accessible place of learning and play. Forest School is also fashionable in the UK, providing a very specialist approach to personal development within the wider context of Outdoor Learning.

=== Australia and New Zealand ===
Throughout Australia & New Zealand many school students undertake outdoor / outdoor and environmental education. Aust / NZ have several outdoor education degrees and vocational outdoor recreation programs. Once teachers and outdoor leaders have completed their studies, many have opportunities to work in schools, private organizations or various outdoor education centres in either country. Outdoor Education is mandated as part of the New Zealand Health and Physical Education as one of the 7 key areas of learning. The Australian Curriculum Assessment and Reporting Authority with support from Outdoor Education Australia has developed curriculum documents to support schools to conduct outdoor education throughout the country primarily through the learning areas of Science, Health and Physical Education and Humanities.

=== Canada ===
Environmental education, most notably outdoor education in Canada is seen through outdoor camp and residential programs, school-based programs and commercial travel operations. Outdoor education in Canada is based around "hard" technical skills—often travel and camping skills—and the "soft"—group skills and personal growth qualities—are blended with, one might say, the "green" and "warm" skills of a complementary eco-adventure focus." Adventures are found whether one is partaking in environmental awareness or team-building workshops throughout Canada.

=== Denmark ===
Denmark is known as one of the more environmentally conscious countries in the developed world. One of the ways in which this presents itself, is through the forest school system that exists there. Children are taught in the woods using nature and animals to learn about basic environmental education as well as the fundamental elementary education that is required.

=== Finland ===
At Finnish schools, the term “outdoor education” represents teaching and learning that takes place outside the classroom with the aim to achieve goals in the National core curriculum for basic education as and in the National core curriculum for upper secondary schools. In the upper secondary schools (students aged 16–18), the theme is “Sustainable development”. Students are encouraged to pursue a sustainable lifestyle, to take action for sustainable development, and to examine the challenges of SD. Some vocational institutes offer secondary lever degree in Nature and Environmental Studies focusing mainly to tourism and experience industries. Humak University of Applied Sciences offers a bachelor's degree in Adventure and Outdoor Education in its English language programme focusing on the technical skills for the adventure sports and pedagogy, tourism and entrepreneurship. Annually 20 students are taken in to the programme. In addition Humak University of Applied Sciences offers updating education for teachers and persons active in adventure sports in their Open University of Applied Sciences.

=== France ===
Alain Kerjean founded in 1986 "Hors Limites-Outward Bound France", adaptation to adults of active pedagogy and introduces in France apprentissage par l'expérience movement. The first Latin country member of this network. Honnor president : SAS Prince Albert of Monaco. In 1994 was founded two bodies : Association Apprendre par l'expérience (youth), and SARL Expérientiel (corporate). From 2008, Alain Kerjean develops Outdoor Education for universities in Romania and advises in France training organizations wishing to design programs based on this pedagogy. His books and articles make available Anglo-Saxon research and publications on the subject to the French public.

=== Japan ===
Surveys of Japanese lower secondary school students conducted in 1984 and 1995 found a decrease in the percentage of students who had ever engaged in various types of outdoor activities. In response to this trend, various forms of outdoor education have begun to be integrated into the educational system. A 2002 paper identified 1000 recently-opened "nature schools" which existed to facilitate this type of education.

=== Spain ===
The first major and highly publicized outdoor learning project was Ruta Quetzal. Launched with assistance of king Juan Carlos in 1979, it was heavily focused on exploring cross-Atlantic Hispanidad cultural links and for decades was managed by the adventurer and media celebrity, Miguel de la Quadra-Salcedo. The project is ongoing. There are numerous similar though less ambitious schemes currently operational, e.g. Rumbo al Sur, annual tours in Africa managed by a TV reality-show star Telmo Aldaz de la Quadra-Salcedo.

== Research and critical views ==
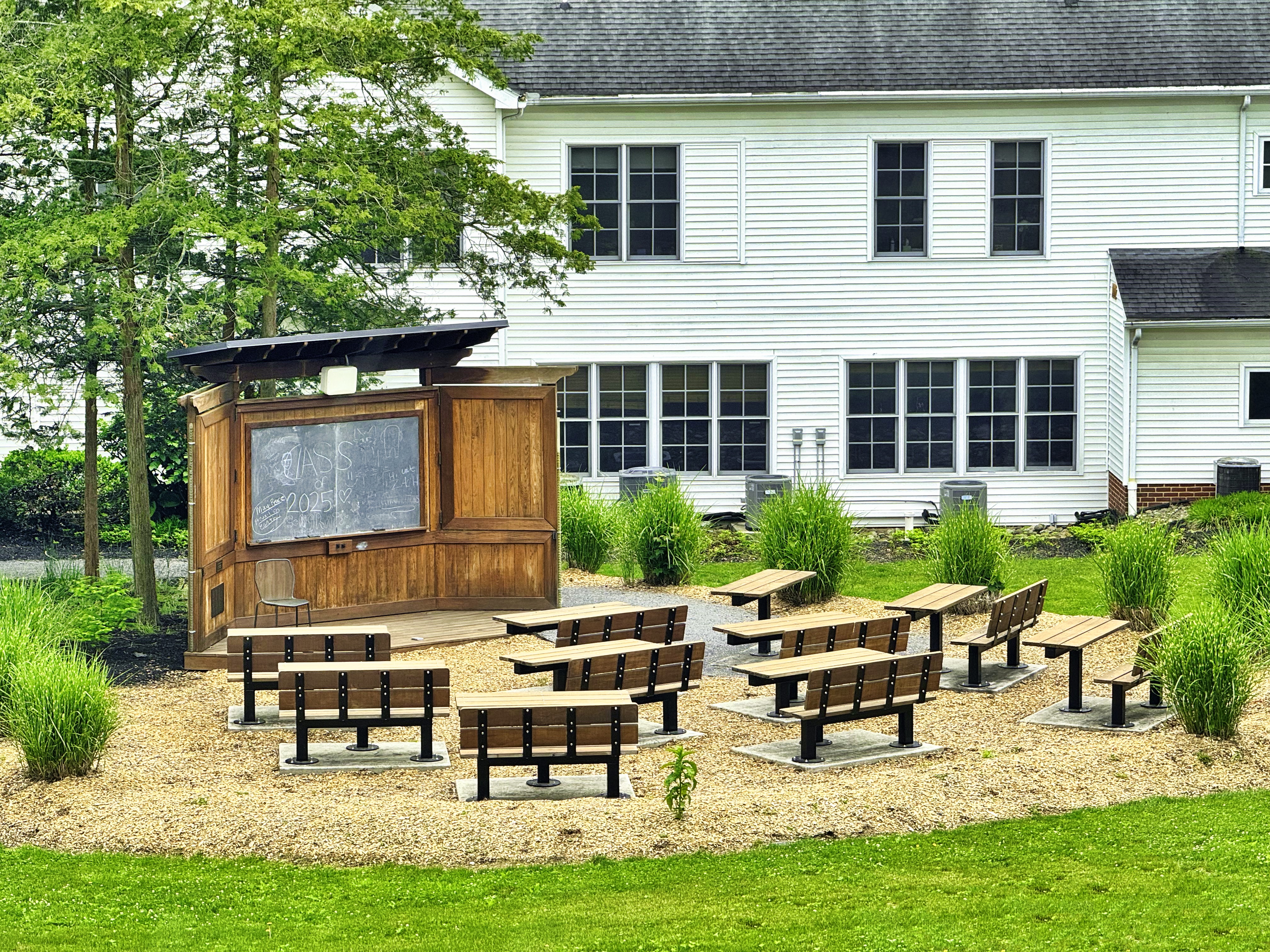
Example of an outdoor classroom at Juniata College in Huntingdon, Pennsylvania

There is much anecdotal evidence about benefits of outdoor education experiences; teachers, for example, often speak of the improvement they have in relationships with students following a camping trip. However, hard evidence showing that outdoor education has a demonstrable long-term effect on behaviour or educational achievement is harder to identify; this may be in part because of the difficulty involved in conducting studies which separate out the effects of outdoor education on meaningful outcomes.

A major meta-analysis of 97 empirical studies indicated a positive overall effect of adventure education programs on outcomes such as self-concept, leadership, and communication skills. This study also indicated that there appeared to be ongoing positive effects. The largest empirical study of the effects of outdoor education programs (mostly Outward Bound programs) found small-moderate short-term positive impacts on a diverse range of generic life skills, with the strongest outcomes for longer, expedition-based programs with motivated young adults, and partial long-term retention of these gains.

In "Adventure in a Bun", Chris Loynes has suggested that outdoor education is increasingly an entertainment park consumption experience. In a paper entitled "The Generative Paradigm", Loynes has also called for an increase in "creativity, spontaneity and vitality".

Outdoor education has been found more beneficial to those students who find classroom learning more challenging. Maynard, Waters & Clement (2013) found that, resonating with their previous findings, the teachers in their study reported "that when engaged in child-initiated activity in the outdoor environment, over half of the children who in the classroom were perceived to be 'underachieving' appeared to behave differently" (p. 221). Their work aims to support the notion that the more natural outdoor spaces in which child-initiated activities take place both directly and indirectly diminish the perception of underachievement. This is important because a number of studies have shown that expectations based on perception of students is important for student learning.

This may also be due to a non-academic family background, or a personal psychological trait such as attention deficit hyperactivity disorder.

When German children from forest kindergartens went to primary school, teachers observed a significant improvement in reading, writing, mathematics, social interactions and many other areas. A yearlong study was done where a group of 9th and 12th grade students learned through outdoor education. The focus was on raising the critical thinking skills of the students as a measure of improvement, where critical thinking was defined to be, "the process of purposeful self-regulatory judgment and decision making". The problem solving capabilities included the ability of students to interpret, to analyze, to evaluate, to infer, to explain and to self-regulate. Researchers found that both 9th and 12th graders scored higher than the control groups in critical thinking by a significant amount. Using the Environment as an Integrating Context for learning (EIC) is the foundation of a substantial report which found benefits in learning outside the classroom on standardized measures of academic achievement in reading, writing, math, science, and social studies; reduced discipline problems; and increased enthusiasm for learning and pride in accomplishments.

== Trends ==
There are several important trends and changing circumstances for outdoor education, including:

- Climate change
- Nature deficit disorder
- Exercise trends and fitness culture
- Rationalization (sociology)
- Standards-based education reform

== See also ==
=== Activities ===
- Abseiling
- Adventure park
- Backpacking
- Camping
- Canoeing
- Geocaching
- Kayaking
- Nature study
- Questing
- Rafting
- Rock climbing
- Ropes course
- Sail training
- Snowboarding
- Orienteering / Wayfinding
- Slacklining
- Skateboarding

=== Associations ===
- American Camp Association
- Association for Experiential Education

=== Organizations ===
- The Duke of Edinburgh's Award – award for personal achievement, including outdoor activities
- National Outdoor Leadership School
- Boy Scouts of America – youth leadership and outdoors training, "Venturing" co-ed for 14-20
- Boston Schoolyard Initiative – elementary school based outdoor environmental education
- Outdoor Education Group – educational organization in Australia
- Outward Bound – international educational organization
- NatureBridge — outdoor school since 1971 in US National Parks
- Solid Rock Outdoor Ministries – Christian Outdoor Leadership and Education organization.
- John Muir Award (disambiguation)
- Forest School

=== People ===
- Robert Stephenson Smyth Baden-Powell: Founder of the Scout Movement and The Scout Association.
- Juliette Gordon Low: Founder of the Girl Scouts of the USA
- Daniel Carter Beard: Outdoorsman. Founder of the Boy Pioneers. Co-founder of the Boy Scouts of America and the Camp Fire Girls.
- Harold C. Bryant: worked on US national parks in education
- Edward Urner Goodman: Scoutmaster. Camp Director, Treasure Island Scout Reservation. National Program Director, Boy Scouts of America. Founder, Order of the Arrow.
- Bear Grylls / Edward Michael Grylls: Outdoor adventurer; summitted Mt. Everest. Chief Scout of The Scout Association.
- Luther Halsey Gulick: Proponent of Playground Education. Co-founder of the Boy Scouts of America and the Camp Fire Girls.
- Kurt Hahn / Kurt Matthias Robert Martin Hahn: Experiential educator. Founder of Schule Schloss Salem, Gordonstoun, and United World Colleges system. Founded Outward Bound with Lawrence Durning Holt and Jim Hogan. Originator of the Moray Badge, the forerunner of the County Badge
- William Hillcourt: Boy Scout; Scoutmaster; Scouting professional. Authored many books and articles on Scouting, outdoor activities, and Scout skills, including the first Scout Fieldbook and three editions of the Boy Scout Handbook of the BSA. Endeavored to maintain the outdoor orientation of US Boy Scouting.
- Clifton F. Hodge: nature study with an evolutionary perspective
- James Kielsmeier: Outward Bound instructor. Proponent of experiential education and service learning. Founder of the National Youth Leadership Council and the Center for Experiential Education and Service-Learning (University of Minnesota).
- Ernst Killander: Soldier; Boy Scout leader; propagator of orienteering.
- Richard Louv: Journalist. Proponent of nature awareness and opponent of what he termed "nature-deficit disorder."
- John P. Milton: Conducted life transformation journeys in wilderness areas of Asia, Africa, North America, and South America. Founder of Sacred Passage and The Way of Nature Fellowship.
- Joshua Lewis Miner, III: Worked at Gordonstoun; took Kurt Hahn's ideas to the US. Co-founder of Colorado Outward Bound School with Charles Froelicher. Founder of Outward Bound USA. Inspired use of outdoor education in the Peace Corps.
- Ohiyesa / Charles Alexander Eastman: North American Indian of the Isáŋyathi tribe of the Dakota nation; physician; author; worked closely with YMCA, Woodcraft Indians, and YMCA Indian Guides; co-founder of the Boy Scouts of America and Camp Fire Girls.
- Tony Pammer: Canoeing instructor. Co-founder and CEO of the Outdoor Education Group.
- Jerry Pieh: Outward Bound instructor and school principal who pioneered the introduction of Outward Bound methods into the mainstream school system; father of Project Adventure (founded with Mary Ladd Smith, Robert Lentz, Karl Rohnke, Jim Schoel and others), which gave impetus to Adventure-Based Counseling.
- Edgar Munroe Robinson: YMCA summer camp director. Set up the fledgling Boy Scouts of America organization.
- Ernest Thompson Seton: Founded the Woodcraft Indians and the Woodcraft League. Inspiration and major source of Baden-Powell's Scouting for Boys. Co-founder of the Boy Scouts of America and the Camp Fire Girls. Chief Scout of the Boy Scouts of America.

=== Topics ===
- Adventure therapy
- Adventure travel
- Deep ecology
- Ecopsychology
- Educational progressivism
- Environmental psychology
- Green exercise
- Minimal impact code
- Natural environment
- Outdoor recreation
- Rite of passage
- Summer camp
- Team building
- Wilderness therapy
- Forest kindergarten
