= James Kielsmeier =

- Education: Ph.D. in education, University of Colorado Masters in International Relations American University; Degree Wheaton College
- Occupation: Nonprofit administration
- Organization(s): National Youth Leadership Council, University of Minnesota
- Known for: Tutor, Youth Rights, International Development
- Spouse: Rev. Deborah Eng Kielsmeier
- Children: 3 daughters
- Awards: Kurt Hahn Award of the Association for Experiential Education Lifetime Achievement Award of the National Indian Youth Leadership Project Rotary Club's Paul Harris Award George Norlin Award
- Honours: Hon. Ph.D. in law from Concordia University, St. Paul

James "Jim" Kielsmeier is founder and President/CEO of the National Youth Leadership Council, based in St. Paul, Minnesota. He also founded the Center for Experiential Education and Service-Learning at the University of Minnesota, where he is also an adjunct professor. Kielsmeier helped initiate the nonprofit African Reconciliation and Development Corps International and led their first project in Somalia (1993–94) during the civil war.

== Biography ==
Kielsmeier spent time as a youth worker in Harlem, and then as a U.S. Army Infantry platoon leader and community relations officer in Korea during the 1960s. In Korea, he developed a program placing GIs as tutors in schools. A former middle and high school teacher and Outward Bound instructor, Kielsmeier founded the National Youth Leadership Council in 1983, initially based at the University of Minnesota.

Kielsmeier has also been engaged in the design and implementation of comprehensive state and federal youth service and service-learning models. He has advised three Minnesota governors, helped U.S. Senators Dave Durenberger and Paul Wellstone write the 1990 and 1993 National and Community Service Act, advised the Clinton and Obama Administrations’ transition teams, and testified before the Minnesota House and Senate and the U.S. House of Representatives. Kielsmeier also helped initiate the nonprofit African Reconciliation and Development Corps International, and led its first project to build schools in Somalia during the civil war in 1993. He is a member of the Board for the newly organized Bilingual Christian University of Congo.

Currently, Kielsmeier is an adjunct professor at the University of Minnesota. He earned a Ph.D. in education from the University of Colorado, a master's in international relations from American University in Washington, D.C., and a bachelor's degree from Wheaton College. In 2008 he was awarded an honorary Doctorate of Laws from Concordia University, St. Paul in Saint Paul. He is married to Rev. Deborah Eng Kielsmeier and is the father of three grown daughters.

== Recognition ==
- Kurt Hahn Award of the Association for Experiential Education
- Lifetime Achievement Award of the National Indian Youth Leadership Project
- Rotary Club's Paul Harris Award
- George Norlin Award, the highest alumni recognition of the University of Colorado

== See also ==
- National Youth Leadership Council
- National Service Learning Conference
- Service-learning
- Youth service
- AmeriCorps
- National service
- Youth Service America
