= Youth Service America =

Youth Service America (YSA)
- Logo of YSA
- Formation: 1986
- Type: Youth organization
- Legal status: Non-profit organization
- Headquarters: Washington, DC
- Location: United States
- Members: Young people ages 5-25
- President & CEO: Steve Culbertson
- Website: YSA.org

Youth Service America (YSA) is an international nonprofit organization promoting youth service, youth voice and youth volunteerism.

== Summary ==
The purpose of the YSA is to support and promote youth voice, youth service, and service-learning through advocacy and resource sharing activities. As a resource center that partners with many other organizations, YSA seeks to increase the quantity and quality of volunteer opportunities for people that are currently between 5 and 25 years of age. Their aim is to serve both nationally and internationally. It is a resource center and as of 2002 an alliance of over 300 organizations which help young people find opportunities to serve their communities, at times providing grants.

The organization's leader, Steve Culbertson, was appointed to the role of President and CEO in 1996.

== Programs ==
Programs include:

- Global youth service day: Working with partners around the world, YSA promotes this one-day annual event to build support for youth volunteerism and youth voice.
- Microfinance grants that use a teaching application process to encourage hundreds of high quality, measurable, service-learning projects by young people around the world;
- Government relations to encourage an ongoing Federal and State investment in national service programs such as AmeriCorps;
- Youth Voice initiative to help young people influence adults and contribute to policies and problems that affect them;
- Communications to spread the word to media about young people as assets and resources.

YSA has also been a long-time partner supporting the National Service Learning Conference, co-sponsored by the National Youth Leadership Council, and operates programs to recognize young people conducting notable service activities internationally.

== Criticism ==
YSA has been included in past criticisms of the youth service movement, which routinely includes compulsory participation forced by educators and cursory recognition by government agencies and others. However, it has been regularly cited as a notable force for youth empowerment for many years.

== See also ==
- Youth service
- National service
- Community service
- Service-learning
- Youth activism
- Civic engagement
- List of awards for volunteerism and community service
