= Nadinne I. Cruz =

American educationist

Nadinne Irene Cruz (born June 28, 1948) has served as an advocate and practitioner of service-learning and experiential education across institutions of higher education.

== Biography ==
Cruz's early volunteer experiences with peasants in the Philippines and her Filipina-American heritage inspired a commitment to integrate teaching with community partnership across diverse worlds of engagement for social change. At the Higher Education Consortium for Urban Affairs (HECUA) in Saint Paul, Minnesota, Cruz led a consortium of 18 colleges and universities to develop community-based learning programs. At Stanford University, Cruz directed the Haas Center for Public Service where she founded and directed the Public Service Scholars Program and taught service-learning courses for the Program in Urban Studies. As Eugene M. Lang Visiting Professor at Swarthmore College, Cruz piloted the Democratic Practice Project for the political science department.

"Service, combined with learning, adds value to each, and transforms both" (Honnet & Poulsen, 1989) is quoted in the service-learning field. It also expresses a broader vision of community engagement that integrates the core purposes of the academy with value to community and the larger public. It is a vision that challenges us with an ethical imperative: if learning requires academic "rigor," should we not also demand "rigor" in the quality of service/benefits to community as an integral part of community engagement? How can we integrate these two "rigors" in the practice of engagement in higher education? What is at stake, and what will it require of us? Cruz's work addresses the tension of competing, and sometimes conflicting, domains of the academy and of the community in the practice of community engagement. Cruz was a 2008 Carleton College commencement speaker on the subject, The Urgent Need for Thinking and Imagination for "Doing Good".

Her Advisory Board involvement includes Center for Community Engagement at Amherst College, in Amherst, Massachusetts, and Youth United for Community Action (YUCA) at East Palo Alto, California. Cruz has two children, David and Claire, with husband Larry.

== Honors and awards ==
- 2001, Distinguished Citizen Scholar by the Commonwealth Honors College, University of Massachusetts-Amherst
- 2003, Experiential Education Pioneer of the Year Award, National Youth Leadership Council
- 2003, California Campus Compact's Richard Cone Award for Excellence and Leadership in Cultivating Community Partnerships in Higher Education
- 2003, Stanford Asian American Award for Outstanding Service by Staff
- 2005, Alec Dickson Servant Leader Award
- 2008, Honorary Doctorate Humanis Causa, Carleton College, Northfield, Minnesota

== Partial works ==
- Cruz, Nadinne. A Challenge to the Notion of Service. Vol. 1, in Combining Service and Learning: a Resource Book for Community and Public Service, by Jane C. Kendall, edited by Jane C. Kendall, 321-323. Raleigh, NC: National Society for Internships and Experiential Learning, 1990.
- Introduction to Diversity Principles in Service-Learning:An Invitation to Reflection and Discussion -- http://www.missouriwestern.edu/appliedlearning/documents/Cruz_DiversityPrinciples-SL_revised_MWSU_Conf_2.09.pdf
- Stanton, T. K., Giles, D. E. & Cruz, N. I. (1999). Service-Learning: A Movement's Pioneers Reflect on Its Origins, Practice, and Future. San Francisco: Jossey-Bass.
- Cruz, Nadinne, and Dwight Giles. "Where's the Community in Service-Learning Research?" Michigan Journal for Service-Learning, November 2000: 28-34.
- Sandy, Marie, Elaine Ikeda, Nadinne Cruz, Barbara Holland, and Kathleen Rice. Community Voices: A California Campus Compact Study on Partnerships. Research, San Francisco: California Campus Compact, 1995.
- Kielsmeier, James C., Pernu, Caryn, Leeper, Thomas J., Seum, Natalie Waters, Cruz, Nadinne I.(2008). Diversity Across the Standards. The Generator. National Youth Leadership Council (NYLC).
- Cruz, Nadinne. A Challenge to the Notion of Service. Vol. 1, in Combining Service and Learning: a Resource Book for Community and Public Service, by Jane C. Kendall, edited by Jane C. Kendall, 321-323. Raleigh, NC: National Society for Internships and Experiential Learning, 1990.
