= Andrew Furco =

Andrew Furco (born April 17, 1961) is an American scholar, researcher, and educator in the field of experiential education, whose work has focused primarily on advancing research in service learning. Service learning is an instructional approach whereby students participate in community service that is linked to their academic learning. Service learning has been adopted in K–12 schools, colleges, and universities in the United States, Canada and in countries throughout South America, Australia, Africa, Asia and Europe (i.e., Germany, Ireland, Spain).

== Contributions to service learning ==
In 1994, Furco established the Service Learning Research and Development Center at the University of California, Berkeley, which is cited as the United States’ first university-based research center for the study of service learning. As the director of this center, he led 26 studies of service learning (domestic and international), which include some of the nation's earliest studies to examine the effects of service learning on participating students.

In 1996, he published the paper “Service-Learning: A Balanced Approach to Experiential Education”, in which he distinguishes service learning from other similar forms of experiential learning, including volunteerism, community service, field education, and internships. Cited in more than 2000 publications, this paper has been used at a substantial number of colleges and universities as a basis for defining service learning.

In 2001, he helped launch and hosted the 1st Annual International Conference on Service-Learning Research. This international conference, held in Berkeley, California, October 21–23, brought together more than 350 participants from a dozen countries to present new research on service learning and to form a network of service learning researchers. The conference continues to be offered annually, hosted by different universities. Through this annual conference, the network of service learning researchers has continued to grow. In 2006, the network was formalized into the first professional international association focused on service learning research (International Association for Research on Service Learning and Community Engagement or IARSLCE).

Furco has developed and validated a number of survey instruments for the study of service learning, including pre-post surveys that measure changes in participants’ perceptions, attitudes, and understanding on civic, social, personal, and academic issues. His Self-Assessment Rubric for Institutionalizing Service Learning in Higher Education (1998), commonly referred to as The Furco Rubric, is a self-assessment instrument that measures the level of service learning institutionalization at universities or colleges. The Furco Rubric has been incorporated into the service learning planning and development at more than 300 colleges and universities in various countries.

His body of work on service learning includes journal articles, technical reports, and the books Service Learning: The Essence of the Pedagogy (2001) and Service Learning Through a Multidisciplinary Lens (2002), both of which he co-edited with Shelley Billing.

== Awards ==
- 2003: Award for Outstanding Contributions to Service-Learning Research, presented by the International Association for Research on Service Learning and Community Engagement
- 2004: The National John Glenn Scholar Award for Service Learning, presented by the Ohio State University
- 2006: Research Leader of the Year Award, presented by the National Society for Experiential Education.
- 2012: Thomas Ehrlich Civically Engaged Faculty Award, presented by Campus Compact.
- 2015: Inducted into the Academy of the Community Engagement Scholarship.
- 2021: John S. Duley Lifetime Achievement Award in Experiential Education, presented by the National Society for Experiential Education.
- 2022: Alec Dickson Servant Leadership Lifetime Achievement Award for Service-Learning, presented by the National Youth Leadership Council.

== Background and education ==
Furco was born and raised in New York City. He studied music at UCLA, where he earned his B.A. in Music in 1984. From 1985 to 1992, he worked as a public school music teacher and school site administrator and earned a master's degree in special education (UCLA, 1986). While working on his doctoral degree in educational administration and policy at the University of California, Berkeley (PhD, 1997), he was appointed in 1995 as the founding director of UC Berkeley's new Service-Learning Research and Development Center. He continued to conduct research at UC Berkeley as center director and faculty member in the Graduate School of Education through 2007. He currently serves as Professor and Associate Department Chair for the Department of Organizational Leadership, Policy, and Development at the University of Minnesota, Twin Cities, as well as the director of the International Center for Research on Community Engagement. From 2008-2021, he served as the university's Associate Vice President for Public Engagement.
