= West Roxbury Education Complex =

West Roxbury Educational Complex
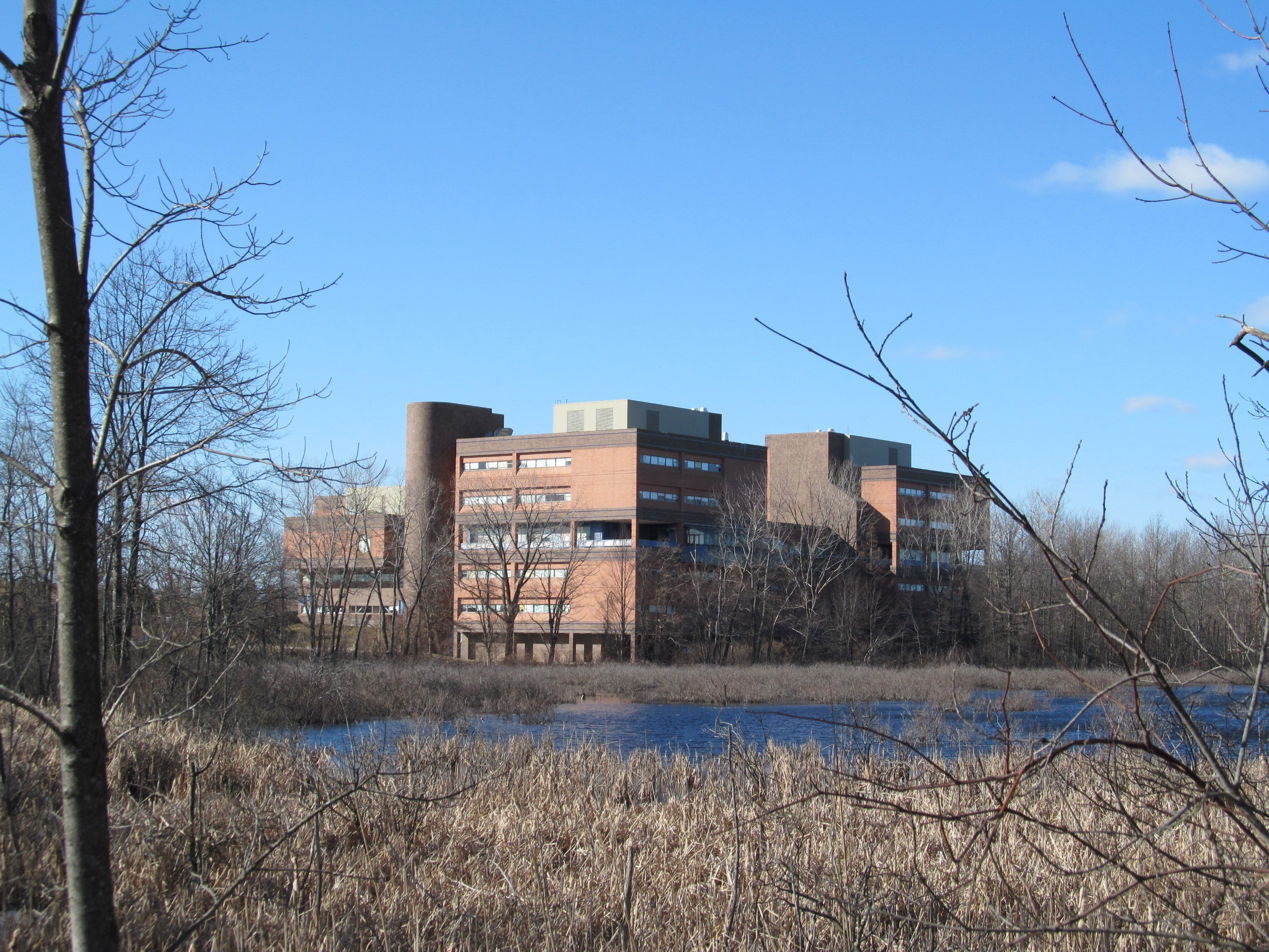

Location
- 1205 V.F.W. Parkway; Boston, Massachusetts; United States
- Coordinates: 42°16′54″N 71°10′33″W

Information
- Type: Public Secondary
- School district: Boston Public Schools

West Roxbury Educational Complex (formerly West Roxbury High School) was a high school complex within Boston Public Schools located in the West Roxbury neighborhood of Boston, Massachusetts. (1976 – 2019)

== History ==
The school was located on a 14-acre site near the 19th Century site of Brook Farm, and in the watershed of the upper Charles River. The school was designed by architects Antonio DeCastro and Samuel Glaser. It was built by The Jackson Construction Company of Dedham.

The school location was built adjacent to a large wetland, Saint Joseph’s Cemetery, the former VFW Parkway Drive In and the former Gardner Street Landfill. The landfill was later capped and became Millennium Park. An island within the wetland is accessible by a boardwalk from the shore behind the school where the Boston Schoolyard Initiative built an outdoor classroom and science education site in collaboration with the Urban Science Academy.

Boston Mayor Kevin White announced plans to build a new high school in West Roxbury in 1973. A groundbreaking ceremony was held on January 7, 1974. The school opened to students in September 1976, and was followed by a semi-formal dedication ceremony on May 19, 1977.

In 1982, cracks appeared and bricks began falling off sections of the school. An investigation revealed an additive substance called Sarabond in the mortar used when the school was built was defective and causing the problem. A suit was filed against Dow Chemical Company, manufacturer of the masonry additive. The city won a $5.5 million settlement in July 1987. Most of the money was used to repair the damage, which changed the appearance of the school with a two brick-color exterior by 1989.

In the fall of 2005, West Roxbury High School was renamed West Roxbury Educational Complex, and was divided into four schools: Media Communications Technology High School, Parkway Academy of Technology and Health, Urban Science Academy and Brook Farm Business & Service Career Academy. Funding was being provided by grants from the Gates Foundation and the Carnegie Foundation.

In the fall of 2011, the West Roxbury Education Complex's four schools were merged into two schools. Brook Farm Academy & Media Communications Technology High School were merged into one school, West Roxbury Academy, while Urban Science Academy and Parkway Academy of Technology and Health were merged into one school at the complex.

In December 2018, the Boston School Committee voted to close the school after Inspectional Services Department deemed the building unsafe. The schools’ student bodies were dispersed to other high schools throughout the district.

== Notable alumni ==
- Ron Stone (class of 1990) – former National Football League player
- Patrice O'Neal (class of 1988) – comedian, radio personality and actor

== Athletics ==
- The West Roxbury Baseball Team won the 2015 Boston City Championship for the first time since 2002 under Coach Cliff Wilson.
- The West Roxbury Football 1984 Team was the first Boston Public School to win a state title.
- The West Roxbury Boys Baseball Team won the Boston City South championship in 2008.
- The West Roxbury Football Team won the Boston City North championship in 2006.
- Longtime coach Leo Sybertz led the West Roxbury Football Team to 5 Super Bowl wins, 2 players who went on to NFL careers, 202 wins, still a record in the City League, 13 league championships and 10 playoff appearances in 31 years as head coach.^{[1]}
- From 1983-1996 the West Roxbury (Westie) High Football team enjoyed almost 15 years of sustained success at the division 5 level. During that 13 year span West Roxbury played in 7 Superbowls, winning four. The wins were in 1983 14 Nantucket 0, 1988, 26 Greater Lowell 6, 1993 30 Greater Lawrence 26, 1995 34 Greater Lawrence 8; the losses were in 1992, Greater Lowell 10 Westie 8, 1994 East Boston (Eastie) 18, Westie 14, 1996, Greater Lowell 21, Westie 6.
