= Elisabeth Hoodless =

British humanitarian

Dame Elisabeth Hoodless DBE

Executive Director of Community Service Volunteers
- In office 1975–2011

Personal details
- Born: Elisabeth Anne Marian Frost; 11 February 1941 (age 85) UK

Dame Elisabeth Anne Marian Hoodless, DBE (née Frost; born 11 February 1941) is a former Executive Director (1975–2011) of Community Service Volunteers (CSV, which was re-named Volunteering Matters in 2015.

She is also a former Labour councillor in North London, and a long-term Labour party member. She was a volunteer Youth court magistrate.

Hoodless is married and has two sons and two granddaughters. She lives in North London.

She is the author of Getting Money from Central Government.

== History ==
Hoodless attended Redland High School for Girls in Bristol and then studied at King's College, Durham (Durham University).

In 1962, Hoodless lived in Israel and taught Hebrew as a volunteer to French-speaking immigrants to prepare them for University. She returned to study social work at the London School of Economics and qualified as a medical social worker.

She was appointed Assistant Director of CSV in 1963, becoming the only paid staff member, since the founding director Dr Alec Dickson (1914–1994), and his wife, Maura, were volunteers.

She became CSV's Deputy Director in 1972 and was their Executive Director from 1975 to 2011

Hoodless chaired the Network of National Volunteer Involving Agencies (NNVIA) which included 46 UK agencies, including the National Trust, Age UK and the Refugee Council until 2001. She was president, Volonteurope; and the Deputy Chair, Speaker's Commission on Citizenship from 1987 to 1990; and was a member of a UK Department of Health working group on Strengthening Volunteering in the National Health Service between 1993 and 1996.

== Awards and honours ==
In 1966 she was awarded a Churchill Fellowship and in 1974 was awarded a Commonwealth Youth Fellowship.

In 2004, Hoodless was named Dame Commander of the Order of the British Empire for her services to volunteering.

She received an Honorary Doctorate Sheffield Hallam University in 2004

She was awarded the Commemorative award for England at the CSV (Community Service Volunteer) Year of the Volunteer awards on 22 January 2006

Dame Elisabeth Hoodless received the Alec Dickson Award at the National Service-Learning Conference in 2009. The award is named for Dame Elisabeth's predecessor, Dr. Alec Dickson.
