= Alexandra Secondary College =

Coordinates: 37°11′41″S 145°42′08″E

- Alexandra, Victoria; Australia

Information
- Type: Public
- Motto: Latin: Labore et Honore (Work and Honour)
- Established: 1957
- Principal: Nigel Lyttle
- Years: 7–12
- Enrolment: 300
- Colours: Yellow and green
- Website: www.asc.vic.edu.au

Alexandra Secondary College is a public coeducational school situated in Downey Street, Alexandra, Victoria.

Alexandra is a rural township 100 kilometres north-east of Melbourne. The school provides secondary education for students from a number of small townships/districts including Eildon, Taggerty, Thornton, Marysville, Narbethong, Buxton, Merton, Yarck and Molesworth. Many of these communities were affected by the Victorian Black Saturday bushfires in 2009. In line with demographic changes enrolment has fallen gradually to 300. It is anticipated that enrolments will stabilise at around 340. It is currently at 320 as of 2026.

== About the school ==
Alexandra Secondary College strives to develop a culture of shared responsibility, personal safety and mutual respect for each other and the environment. The college aspires to challenge the staff and students by providing a curriculum which is enjoyable, challenging, stimulating and encouraging of personal and community achievement. The college values which include respect, achievement, challenge, enjoyment, responsibility and safety were developed following an extensive consultation process with the community. As of 2014 the college has moved towards developing a School Wide Positive Behaviour Support (SWPBS) program in collaboration with parents and students and this will be rolled out further in 2015.

The college curriculum provides for a common program at years 7 & 8 in each of the key learning areas of study. Year 9 and 10 students undertake core studies in English and Mathematics and elect studies from each of the other learning areas. Student electives are regulated to ensure that each student undertakes a minimum requirement in each area of study over two years. This system, which enables students to pursue additional studies in preferred learning areas, provides a sound preparation for the Victorian Certificate of Education (VCE) and/or the Victorian Certificate of Applied Learning (VCAL). The college offers a broad range of studies at the VCE level and runs a VCAL program. Links with TAFE colleges have also been established which provide vocational courses for students. As of 2012 the college is a registered trade training centre and offers Hospitality, Construction and Automotive as part of its extensive VET program.

The school has undergone great changes as a new science centre has been constructed and plans for a complete rebuild of the school are in the early stages. A recent visit by the State Minister for Education, Martin Dixon continued this effort with the announcement of $870,000 of government funding to assist in the refurbishment of some of the college's learning spaces.

Students at the college have been engaged in a number of projects with external partners. Since 2008, six female students have participated in a 10-day outdoor education experience run by the Alice Sloan Trust as part of a program to make outdoor education opportunities open to all students, and to develop leadership skills, this program continues alongside other opportunities that include, but are not limited to national adventure race team that competes annually in the Outdoor Education Groups Snowgum Hillary Challenge as well as student involvement in the statewide Leadership development program offered by the DEECD Alpine school program.

Students also participate in a project with the National Museum of Australia in evaluating the water quality of local water sources.

== History ==
Alexandra Secondary College opened its doors in 1957 as Alexandra High School. In 2007 the school celebrated its 50th anniversary with past-student reunions and events.
