= Hoodless =

Hoodless is a surname. Notable people with the surname include:

- Adelaide Hoodless (1858–1910), Canadian educational reformer
- Elisabeth Hoodless (born 1941), British administrator, executive director of Community Service Volunteers
