= Expeditionary education =

Educational philosophy using expeditions as learning experiences

Expeditionary education, often referred to as expeditionary learning, is learning associated with exploration and journey-based experiences or expeditions within these fields. Expeditionary education is often associated with adventure education, outdoor education, environmental education or experiential education. Usually involving elements of challenge, adventure and leadership, expeditionary education can take place in a variety of settings including wilderness, classrooms and even virtual spaces (the internet). Participants in expeditionary education can be directly involved in the expedition, or may be linked to expeditions undertaken by others.

== Scope ==
=== Definitions ===
Webster's online dictionary defines expeditionary as "of, relating to, or being an expedition." Expeditionary education is of, relating to, or being an expedition within an educational framework. Expeditionary education may be mistakenly defined as a subset of or synonymous to outdoor education, adventure education, or experiential education. While many expeditionary education programs of, or being an expedition could be defined under these existing fields (such as Outward Bound, or NOLS), educational programs relating to expeditions may take place in the classroom and not outside, requiring adventure, or experiential in nature are becoming more prevalent as explorers and expedition based researchers strive to connect educational content to their projects.

=== Related disciplines ===
- Adventure education
- Environmental education
- Environmental studies
- Experiential education
- Outdoor education

=== Summary of program types ===
Expeditionary education can be:

1. An educational expedition one participates in (Programs of or being expeditionary education).
2. An expedition with educational agendas of various involvement levels for non-expedition members (Programs relating to expeditions).

== History ==
The origins of expeditionary education could be thought to extend far back into early human history through hunting and gathering expeditions where traditional ecological knowledge was learned. Potentially, one of the first formal applications of expeditionary education were the field trips conducted by Henry David Thoreau and his brother, John's, Concord, MA grammar school in 1838. Later in the 19th century a summer camping movement was established in response to anxieties about urban and industrial influences on children. During this time, expeditions into "nature" were combined with informal educational pursuits. Scouting, a movement started in 1907 by Robert Baden-Powell initiated widespread development of practical outdoor skills which often incorporated expeditionary components like camping, backpacking, and canoeing and has grown to 38 million members in 216 countries 100 years after its inception. By the late 20th century expeditions were being used as educational vehicles by many private and public sector groups and has grown into large groups such as Outward Bound, serving over 200,000 students in 2006 and National Outdoor Leadership School who have trained over 120,000 people. Various contemporary groups and programs are discussed in #Programs

== Psychology and philosophy ==
Expedition as a mode of educational pursuit has its theoretical and applied roots in many soils. Many people, theories, and practices can be identified as influential.

=== People ===
- John Dewey: Philosopher, educational reformer and proponent of experiential learning
- Kurt Hahn: Founder of the Gordonstoun school and Outward Bound
- John Muir: Philosopher, naturalist, conservationist, inventor writer and wilderness traveller
- Paul Petzoldt: Founder of the National Outdoor Leadership School
- Will Steger: Arctic Explorer and educator
- Henry David Thoreau: Philosopher, naturalist, transcendentalist, tax resister, surveyor, writer
- Willi Unsoeld: Facilitator of outdoor, experiential, and expeditionary education

=== Theories ===
- Experiential education theories
- Group development theories
- Outward bound process model
- Psychoevolutionary theory and the Biophilia hypothesis
- Stress, optimal arousal, comfort zone, and Flow (psychology) theories

== Research ==
Research has been conducted on various aspects of expeditionary education. Correlations between a controlled exposure to challenge and psychological resiliency have been found by researchers James Neill and Katica Dias in their study of young adult Outward Bound participants. In a review of 150 research studies conducted between 1993 and 2003, general findings of positive impacts from outdoor learning In another meta analysis, focus areas such as self-concept, leadership, and communications skills were shown to have positive gains during the educational experience, and in contrast to many educational interventions, significant ongoing gains in follow up reviews. While these and other studies point to positive results, the difficulty of drawing causality between psychologically gained elements and these programs in empirically based studies exist in the number of variables to control for and the strength of experimental designs.

== See also ==
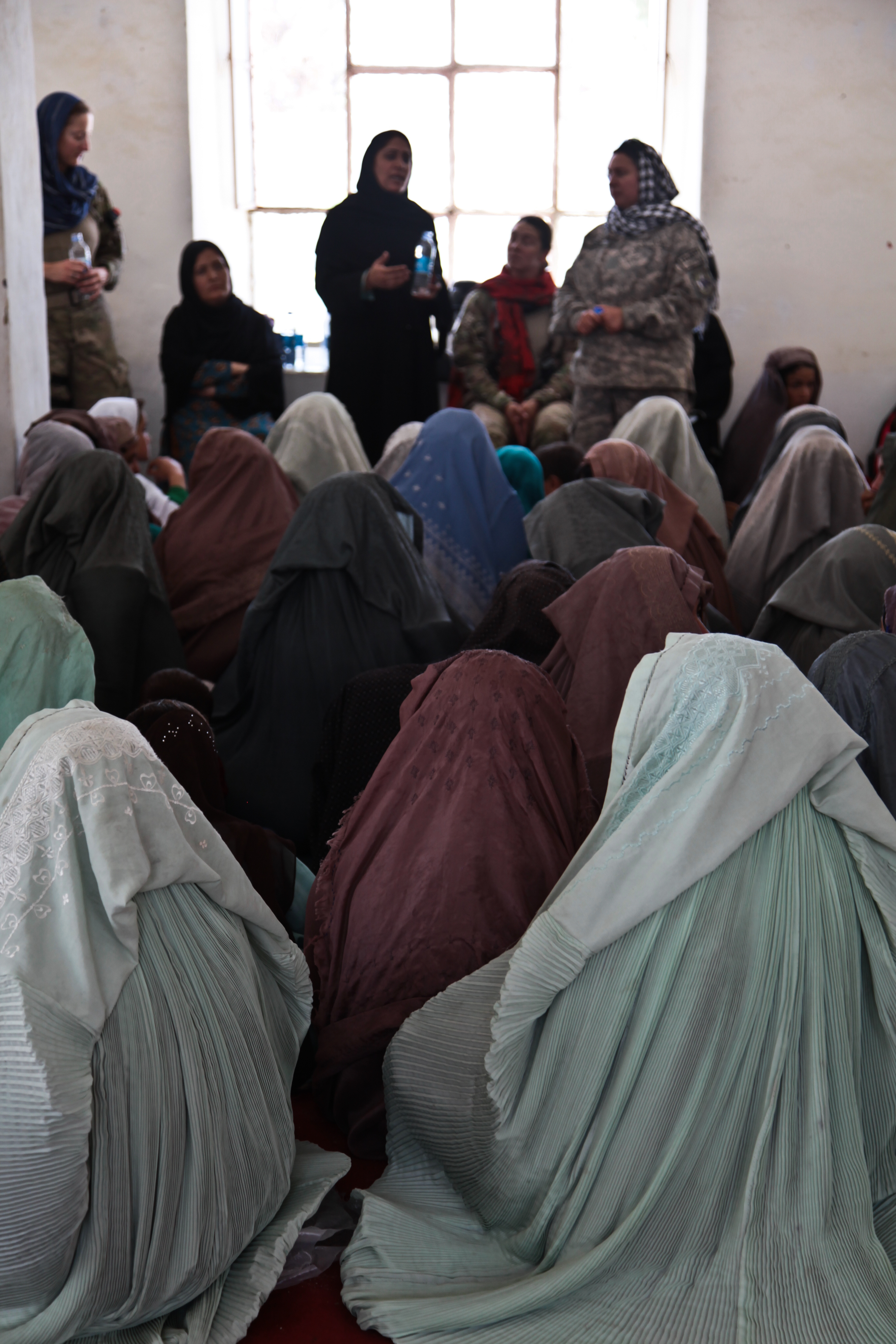
More than 130 national females and their children attended the "female health education event" in which Dr. Mahjaben and the Kandahar Provincial Directorate of Women's Affairs, Mim Roqiyah Achackyzi gave them information at the district center in Spin Boldak City.

- Alternative education
- Education
- Educational philosophies
- Progressive education
- Category:American environmentalists
