= Solid Rock Outdoor Ministries =

Coordinates: 41.2936°N 105.5905°W

Solid Rock Outdoor Ministries (SROM) is a Christian non-profit outdoor education and wilderness adventure school. SROM focuses teaching on four major areas through experiential education: technical outdoor skills, leadership development, wilderness care/ethics, and spiritual transformation. Activities that SROM teaches include rock climbing, backpacking, snowshoeing, and mountaineering. SROM offers customized courses and open enrollment courses ranging from one to forty days in length. SROM is accredited by the Association for Experiential Education (AEE), and is a partner of the Leave No Trace Center for Outdoor Ethics. College credit is available for some courses through Columbia International University. SROM currently operates in the Wind River Range, Snowy Range, Never Summer Mountains, and Vedauwoo; Rocky Mountain National Park, Grand Canyon National Park, Yosemite National Park and mountainous areas internationally.

== History ==
1983 – SROM is founded as a 501(c) 3 non-profit organization.
1997 – Drew Arnold steps down as pastor of his pioneering work at Harvest Church to become full-time director of SROM.
2003 – SROM moves its administrative headquarters to a new building in Laramie, WY.
2004 – SROM launches inaugural 40-day-40-night wilderness leadership development course.
2006 – SROM receives institutional accreditation with the Association of Experiential Education.
2008 – SROM celebrates 25 years of wilderness ministry.

== See also ==
- Outdoor education
- Experiential education
