= Buxton, Victoria =

Buxton
- Town
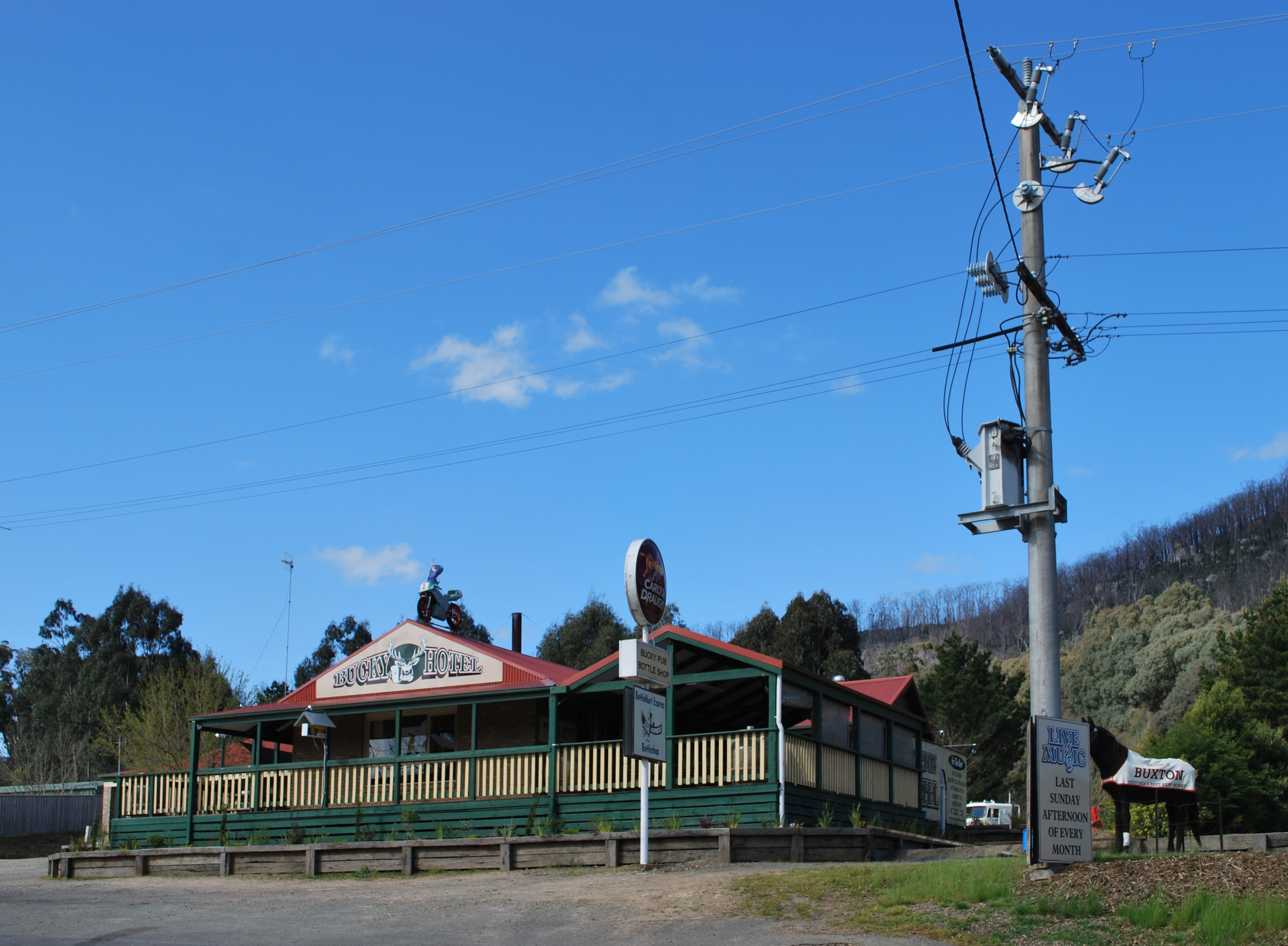
- The Buxton Hotel

- Interactive map of Buxton
- Coordinates: 37°29′S 145°43′E
- Country: Australia
- State: Victoria
- Region: Hume
- LGA: Shire of Murrindindi
- Location: 104 km (65 mi) NE of Melbourne; 30 km (19 mi) S of Alexandra; 11 km (6.8 mi) N of Marysville

Government
  - State electorate: Eildon
  - Federal division: Indi

Population
  - Total: 591 (2021 census)
- Postcode: 3711

Buxton is a town 104 kilometres (65 mi) north-east of Melbourne in the Australian state of Victoria. At the 2021 census, Buxton had a population of 591.

The district around Buxton was significantly impacted by the Black Saturday bushfires. It was isolated for several days with no telephone or power.

Today Buxton has a roadhouse, post office (shut down 6 January 2026), general store, fishing and outdoors store, Salmon and Trout Farm, hotel, town hall, primary school, nursery and several bed and breakfasts.

== Facilities ==
Buxton has an active Country Fire Authority station with one medium and one light tanker. The Buxton Fire Brigade was formed in 1943 and officially recognised on 25 February 1944.

After the 2009 Black Saturday fires, the Marysville Police station was temporarily relocated to Buxton until the new station was opened in 2012.

The Igloo Roadhouse opened in 1946 and is known for their burgers. The Buxton Post Office opened on 1 February 1873 and closed 6 January 2026.

Buxton Primary School opened in 1875. The original school building was refurbished in 2011 and a new building was constructed in 2012. Another building was refurbished in 2015 for use as an environmental science classroom.

The closest secondary school is Alexandra Secondary College.

== Population ==
In the 2021 Census, there were 591 people in Buxton. 76.8% of people were born in Australia and 88.3% of people spoke only English at home.
