= Independent School League =

Independent School League or ISL may refer to:

- Independent School League (Illinois), a group of nine Chicago-area preparatory schools
- Independent School League (New England), a group of 16 New England preparatory schools
- Independent School League (Washington, D.C. area), a group of 17 Washington, D.C. preparatory schools
- Interscholastic League of Honolulu, a group of Hawaiian private schools

== See also ==
- ISL (disambiguation)
