= Sainte-Foy-lès-Lyon =

- Commune
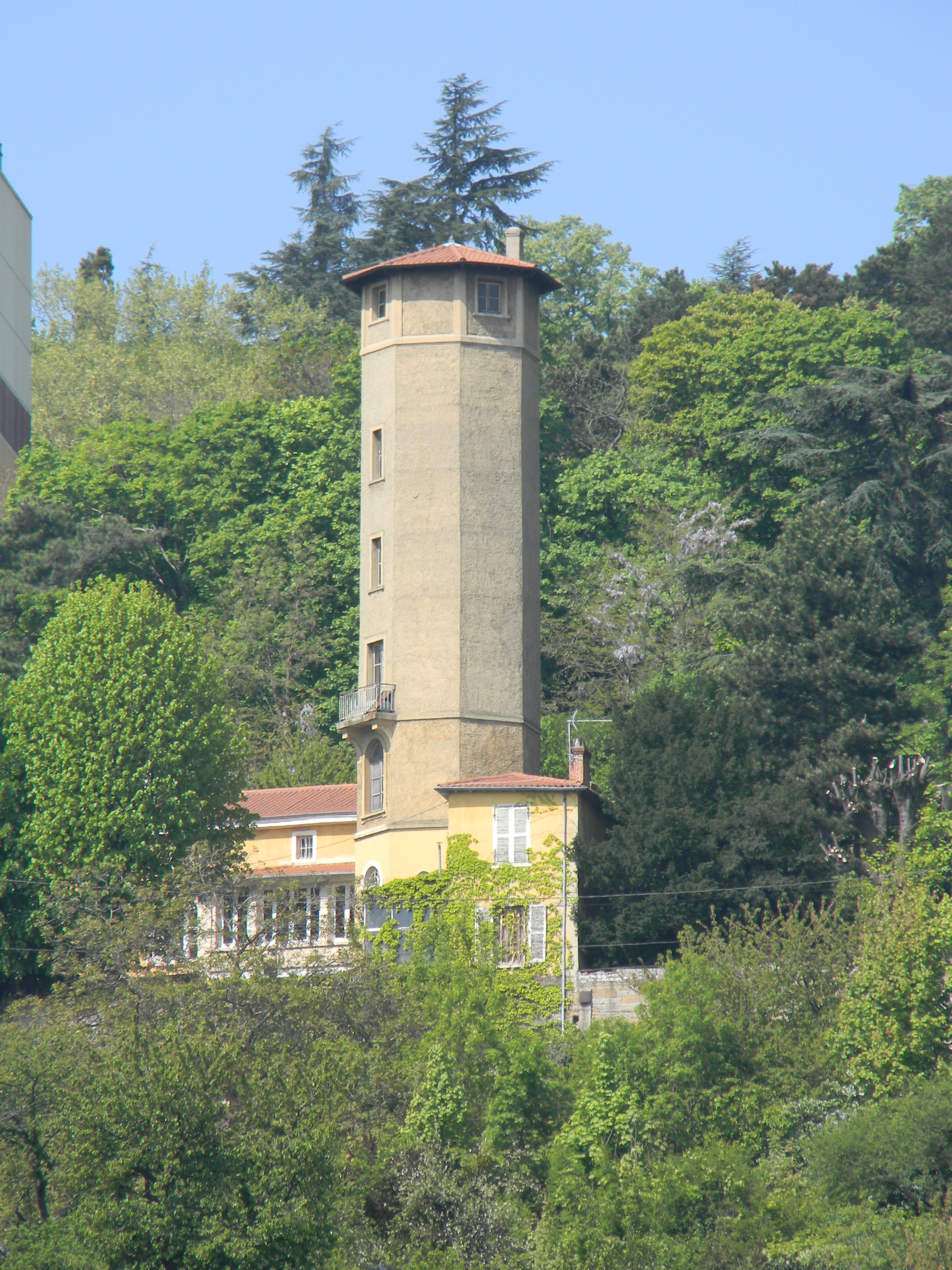
- Tower building on the side of the Saône river

- Coat of arms
- Location of Sainte-Foy-lès-Lyon
- Location within France Location within Auvergne-Rhône-Alpes
- Coordinates: 45°44′N 4°48′E
- Country: France
- Region: Auvergne-Rhône-Alpes
- Metropolis: Lyon Metropolis
- Arrondissement: Lyon

Government
  - Mayor (2020–2026): Véronique Sarselli (LR)
- Area^{1}: 6.83 km^{2} (2.64 sq mi)
- Elevation: 311 m (1,020 ft)
- Highest elevation: 322 m (1,056 ft)
- Lowest elevation: 170 m (560 ft)
- Population (2023): 21,692
  - Density: 3,180/km^{2} (8,230/sq mi)
- Time zone: UTC+01:00 (CET)
  - Summer (DST): UTC+02:00 (CEST)
- INSEE/Postal code: 69202 /69110
- ^{1} French Land Register data, which excludes lakes, ponds, glaciers > 1 km^{2} (0.386 sq mi or 247 acres) and river estuaries.

Sainte-Foy-lès-Lyon (French pronunciation: [sɛ̃t fwa lɛ ljɔ̃], lit. 'Sainte-Foy near Lyon') is a commune in the Metropolis of Lyon in Auvergne-Rhône-Alpes region in eastern France.

== History ==
The Hôtel de Ville

The Hôtel de Ville was built as a private residence and completed in 1882.

== Geography ==
It is a suburb of the city of Lyon, located to the west of the city.

It is located only 5 km (3.1 mi) from the center of Lyon, but is a community in its own right. The town grew as a haven from the industry of Lyon because it is set high above the city. From a park known as the ‘Esplanade de Lichfield,’ there are panoramic views of Lyon and the surrounding area.

Lyon is said to be the city of three rivers – the Rhône and Saône rivers which converge there – and the Beaujolais wine. Sainte Foy's historic asset is remains of a Roman aqueduct and there is a fine seminary, steep narrow walled streets, parks and gardens, and squares in the town center.

== Population ==
Historical population

| Year | Pop. | ±% p.a. |
|---|---|---|
| 1793 | 2,044 | — |
| 1800 | 2,110 | +0.46% |
| 1806 | 1,697 | −3.57% |
| 1821 | 2,016 | +1.15% |
| 1831 | 2,312 | +1.38% |
| 1836 | 2,808 | +3.96% |
| 1841 | 2,737 | −0.51% |
| 1846 | 3,120 | +2.65% |
| 1851 | 3,127 | +0.04% |
| 1856 | 4,114 | +5.64% |
| 1861 | 4,462 | +1.64% |
| 1866 | 5,042 | +2.47% |
| 1872 | 4,668 | −1.28% |
| 1876 | 5,118 | +2.33% |
| 1881 | 5,732 | +2.29% |
| 1886 | 3,105 | −11.54% |
| 1891 | 2,907 | −1.31% |
| 1896 | 2,914 | +0.05% |
| 1901 | 3,106 | +1.28% |

| Year | Pop. | ±% p.a. |
|---|---|---|
| 1906 | 3,147 | +0.26% |
| 1911 | 3,358 | +1.31% |
| 1921 | 3,782 | +1.20% |
| 1926 | 4,505 | +3.56% |
| 1931 | 5,074 | +2.41% |
| 1936 | 5,335 | +1.01% |
| 1946 | 6,270 | +1.63% |
| 1954 | 7,290 | +1.90% |
| 1962 | 9,592 | +3.49% |
| 1968 | 16,583 | +9.55% |
| 1975 | 21,698 | +3.92% |
| 1982 | 21,521 | −0.12% |
| 1990 | 21,450 | −0.04% |
| 1999 | 21,193 | −0.13% |
| 2007 | 22,151 | +0.55% |
| 2012 | 21,707 | −0.40% |
| 2017 | 22,012 | +0.28% |
| 2023 | 21,692 | −0.24% |

Source: EHESS and INSEE (1968-2023)

== Education ==
International School of Lyon is located in the city of Sainte-Foy-lès-Lyon.

== Twin towns ==
Sainte-Foy-lès-Lyon is twinned with

- Lichfield, Staffordshire, England.
- Kraljevo, Serbia
- Limburg an der Lahn, Germany

== Notable people ==
- Antoine Cariot (1820–1883), priest and botanist, died in Sainte-Foy-lès-Lyon
- Alexis Carrel (1873–1944), surgeon, biologist and eugenicist, who was awarded the Nobel Prize in Physiology or Medicine in 1912
- Éric-Emmanuel Schmitt (born 1960), novelist and playwright
- Isabelle Patissier (born 1967), world champion rock climber and rally driver
- Frédéric Kanouté (born 1977), Malian-French footballer
- Florian Maurice (born 1974), French footballer

== See also ==
- Communes of the Metropolis of Lyon
