= Youth voice =

Collective mindset of young people

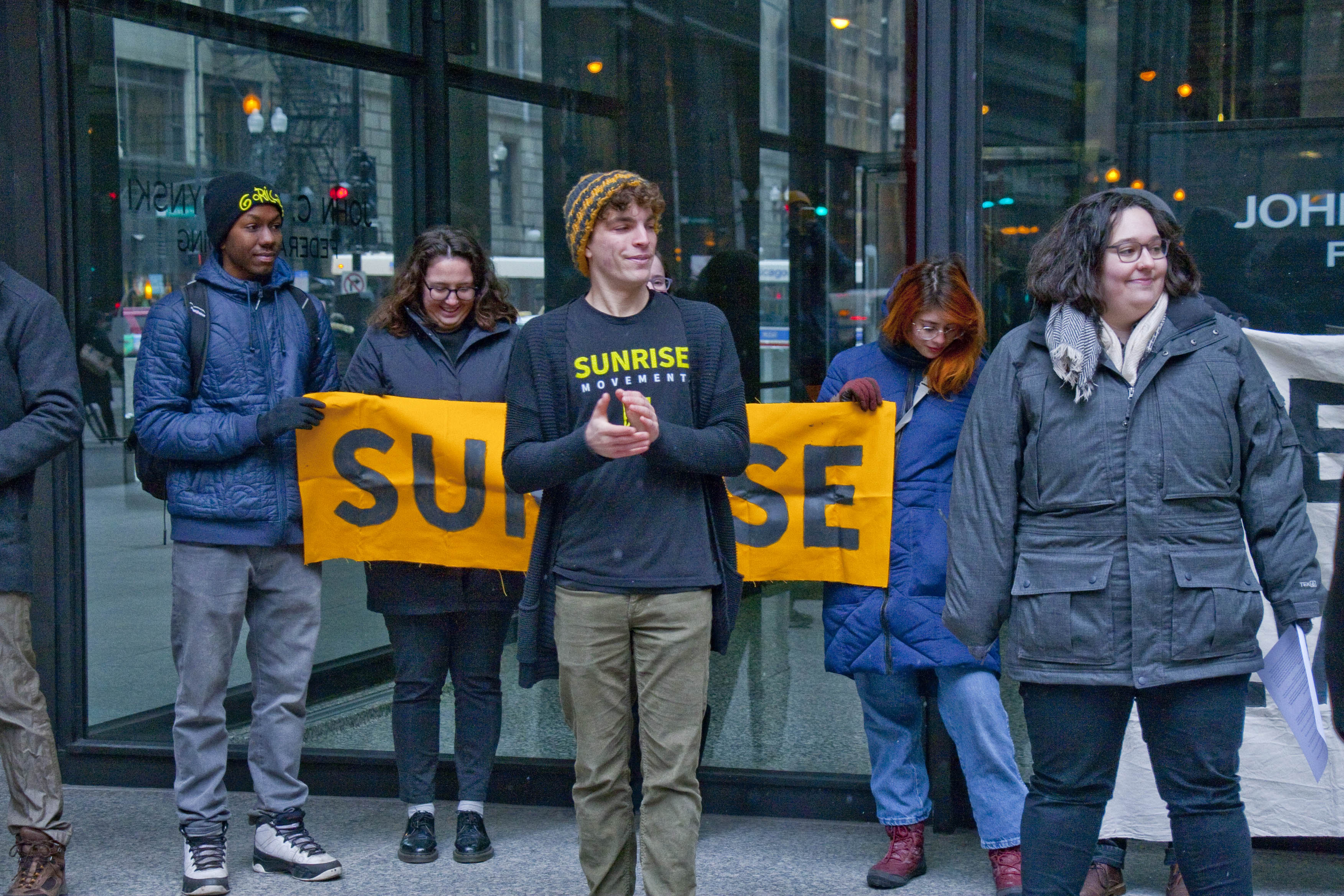
Youth protesting climate change

Youth voice refers to the distinct ideas, opinions, attitudes, knowledge, and actions of young people as a collective body. The term youth voice often groups together a diversity of perspectives and experiences, regardless of backgrounds, identities, and cultural differences. It is frequently associated with the successful application of a variety of youth development activities, including service learning, youth research, and leadership training. Additional research has shown that engaging youth voice is an essential element of effective organizational development among community and youth-serving organizations.

== Applications ==
Many youth organizations and community activities cite youth voice as an important factor to their successful operations. Many organizations, for example, consult young people when developing programs, products, or services designed for young people, or ensure that young people serve on decision making boards. In addition, youth serving organizations often provide opportunities and platforms to elevate youth voice--inviting young program participants to share their perspectives on institutional websites or social media channels. The field of positive youth development also promotes youth voice by striving to inspire confidence and social engagement for young people. Examples of school-oriented youth voice efforts include the VicSRC, an Australian student voice organization.

Other examples include:

- Youth service
- Community youth development
- Youth activism
- Peer education
- Youth-led media
- Youth leadership

== Movement ==
A broad international movement exists to promote youth voice, born from earlier youth service and youth rights movements. The United Nations Convention on the Rights of the Child was the first international mechanism to stipulate the systemic engagement of youth voice. Specific aims are stated in Articles 5 and 12 that clearly acknowledge the youth have a voice, that youth voice is constantly changing, and that all areas of our society are morally responsible for engaging youth voice. Annual events which center on youth voice include Global Youth Service Day and the National Service Learning Conference.

== Criticism ==
Ephebiphobia and adultism have been identified as the factors preventing widespread recognition of youth voice throughout communities. Additionally, it is commonly acknowledged that "little quantitative research has been conducted regarding the issue of youth voice", while the qualitative research on youth voice is often seen as minimally effective, as well, due to a limited scope focused on youth participation in decision-making and opinion-sharing.

Other common pitfalls associated with youth voice are tokenism and unethical storytelling practices that use the voices, ideas, and stories of young people in exploitative ways. Though not focused specifically on youth voice, Hart's Ladder of Participation provides an illustration of youth engagement—from the bottom rung of "manipulation" to the top rung where "decision making is shared between youth and adults working as equal partners."

Youth voice also faces criticism from the youth rights movement that it does not go far enough, or that it is using youth. Critics claim that youth voice advocates only advance a shallow analysis of ageism and propose solutions that do not go far enough to give youth any substantive power in society. Coupled with youth service this can lead to young people being pressured to help fix adult problems without ever addressing the problems youth face.

== See also ==
- Positive psychology
- Teaching for social justice
- Critical pedagogy
- Convention on the Rights of the Child
- Student voice
- Adultcentrism
- Youth-led development
- List of youth empowerment organizations
- Positive youth development
- Youth empowerment
