= Volunteering Matters =

British charity

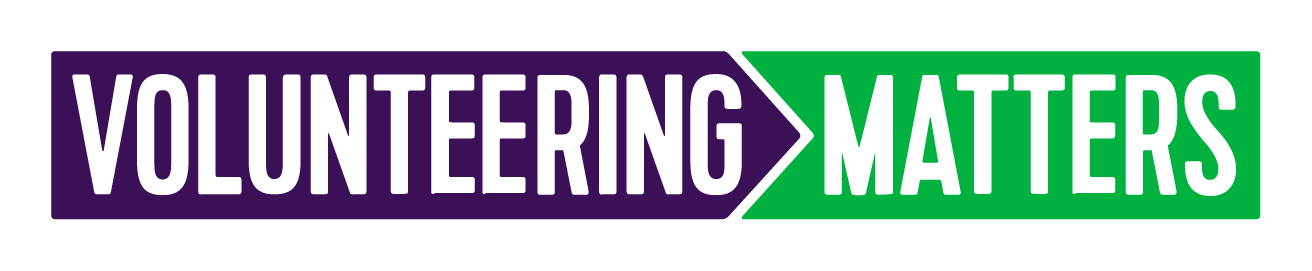
- Founded: April 23, 1962; 64 years ago
- Founder: Alec Dickson
- Purpose: Volunteering and social action
- Location: HQ, London, EH8, U.K.
- Region served: England, Scotland and Wales
- Website: www.volunteeringmatters.org.uk
- Formerly called: Community Service Volunteers (CSV)

Volunteering Matters is a British volunteering charity operating across England, Scotland and Wales. Founded in 1962 as Community Service Volunteers (CSV), the organisation develops volunteering and community programmes involving young people, older people and local communities.

Its activities include mentoring, youth social action, environmental volunteering, community support and initiatives addressing loneliness and social isolation.

The organisation's Chief Executive is Amanda Naylor OBE and its Chair of Trustees is Peta Foxall CBE. The President is Lord Freud.

== History ==
=== Founding and early development ===
Volunteering Matters was established in 1962 as Community Service Volunteers by Alec Dickson. The organisation was created to encourage participation in volunteering and provide opportunities for people to contribute to their communities.

CSV subsequently developed volunteering programmes involving young people, families, older people and public services.

=== Make a Difference Day ===
In 1996, CSV launched Make a Difference Day, a national campaign encouraging people to volunteer in their communities.

In September 1997, The Independent reported that approximately 9,000 volunteers had participated in 430 projects during the first event. Activities included environmental improvements, restoring community facilities and supporting vulnerable residents.

By 2008, the campaign had attracted substantial participation. A House of Commons Early Day Motion recorded that approximately 700,000 people had taken part since 1996, with 35,000 volunteers participating in 1,269 projects during 2008.

In 2009, The Independent reported on CSV's Make a Difference Day, highlighting volunteering activities taking place across the United Kingdom. The article described how individuals and community groups participated in projects intended to improve their local areas.

=== Volunteering and public services ===
During the 2000s, CSV developed programmes involving volunteers in public services and community support.

In January 2003, The Guardian reported that CSV was working with local authority social services departments to develop a programme involving trained community volunteers in supporting children and families identified as being at risk.

The programme, known as CSV for Children, was intended to strengthen local support networks and complement the work of social services professionals.

CSV also worked with the BBC through community volunteering initiatives, including Action Desks at local radio stations. These initiatives encouraged listeners to participate in volunteering opportunities and community activities.

In November 2014, The Guardian revisited CSV's Volunteers in Child Protection programme, reporting on the role of trained volunteers in providing support and stability to vulnerable children and families. The programme demonstrated the continued involvement of volunteers in supporting families alongside statutory services.

=== Renaming as Volunteering Matters ===
In 2015, Community Service Volunteers adopted the name Volunteering Matters. The organisation continued developing volunteering programmes across the United Kingdom.

Its subsequent work included mentoring, community-led volunteering, youth social action and environmental projects.

== Programmes and activities ==
=== Youth volunteering and social action ===
Volunteering Matters supports young people to participate in volunteering and social action through projects involving schools, community organisations and local partners.

Its activities have included youth-led community projects, opportunities to develop skills and initiatives encouraging young people to participate in decisions affecting their communities.

The organisation has also been involved in the #iwill Movement, which promotes youth social action across the United Kingdom.

=== Grandmentors ===
Grandmentors is a mentoring programme supporting young people with experience of the care system. Volunteer mentors provide support with confidence, independent living, education, employment and personal development. According to Volunteering Matters' 2023/24 impact reporting, 286 volunteers supported 240 care-experienced young people through Grandmentors across 15 locations.

=== Environmental volunteering ===
Volunteering Matters delivers environmental volunteering activities, including Action Earth in Scotland. These activities involve volunteers in improving green spaces, protecting local environments and supporting community-led environmental projects. The organisation reported that more than 4,100 volunteers participated in environmental action through Action Earth during 2023/24.

=== Volunteering among older people ===
The organisation has delivered programmes encouraging older people to volunteer and remain active in their communities. These include the Retired and Senior Volunteer Programme (RSVP), which provides opportunities for older volunteers to contribute to community activities and support local services. According to its 2023/24 impact report, more than 3,500 volunteers participated in RSVP activities.

=== Community support and wellbeing ===
Volunteering Matters also develops programmes addressing loneliness, social isolation and health inequalities. Its projects include befriending, community activities, practical support and opportunities for people to develop social connections through volunteering.

== Strategy, policy and impact ==
Volunteering Matters' 2025–2030 strategy sets out its organisational priorities and approach to volunteering.

The strategy identifies five areas of focus:

1. Reducing loneliness and social isolation.
2. Improving health and wellbeing.
3. Supporting young people and intergenerational participation.
4. Strengthening social cohesion.
5. Enabling community-led action and volunteering.

The strategy also identifies priorities relating to inclusive participation, volunteer involvement, measuring impact, partnerships and volunteering policy.

=== Impact ===
Volunteering Matters publishes annual reports describing its volunteering activities and reported outcomes. According to its 2023/24 impact report:

- More than 10,600 people volunteered or participated in social action through its projects.
- 95% of surveyed volunteers reported making a positive difference.
- More than 4,100 volunteers participated in environmental activities through Action Earth.
- More than 3,500 volunteers participated in RSVP.
- 568 young people participated in youth social action projects.
- 286 volunteer mentors supported 240 care-experienced young people through Grandmentors.
- 73% of surveyed volunteers reported developing or improving their skills.

These figures are drawn from the charity's own reporting.

=== Policy and partnerships ===
Alongside programme delivery, Volunteering Matters contributes to policy discussions about volunteering, community participation and social action.

The organisation has participated in sector initiatives including the Vision for Volunteering and the #iwill Movement.

Its policy work addresses issues including access to volunteering, youth participation, community involvement and the contribution of volunteering to public services.

== Awards and honours ==
Volunteering Matters was named charity of the year in September, 2015 at the European Diversity Awards (EDAs).
