= Learn and Serve America =

the LSA logo

Learn and Serve America (LSA) was a United States government program under the authority of the Corporation For National and Community Service. Its mission was to provide opportunities for students nationwide to participate in service learning projects, and to gain valuable experience while helping communities. It sponsored the President's Higher Education Community Service Honor Roll.

== Programs ==
Learn and Serve America's budget was primarily distributed to K–12 and higher education institutions, as well as community organizations, upon request, in the form of grants. Of the money earmarked for grants, approximately half was distributed on a population-based formula to state education agencies, while another quarter was granted on a competitive basis to community based organizations and Indian Tribes; 25% was reserved for competitive grants to higher education institutions or consortia. Learn and Serve America also oversaw the Presidential Freedom Scholarships, the Presidential Volunteer Service Awards, and the President's Higher Education Community Service Honor Roll. Learn and Serve America provided leadership and support to the National Service-Learning Clearinghouse.

== History ==
Learn and Serve America grew from Serve America, a program created under the National and Community Service Act of 1990. When the Corporation for National and Community Service was created in 1993, Serve America was reformed as Learn and Serve America. Learn and Serve America was reauthorized in the 2009 Edward M. Kennedy Serve America Act. In 2011 the United States House Appropriations Committee eliminated the entire budget for the Learn and Serve America program.

== See also ==
- Service-learning
- National service
