= Ron Stone (American football) =

American football player (born 1971)

No. 65, 67
- Position: Guard

Personal information
- Born: July 20, 1971 (age 55); Boston, Massachusetts, US
- Listed height: 6 ft 5 in (1.96 m)
- Listed weight: 325 lb (147 kg)

Career information
- High school: West Roxbury (Boston)
- College: Boston College
- NFL draft: 1993: 4th round, 96th overall pick

Career history
- Dallas Cowboys (1993–1995); New York Giants (1996–2001); San Francisco 49ers (2002–2003); Oakland Raiders (2004–2005)

Awards and highlights
- 2× Super Bowl champion (XXVIII, XXX); 2× All-Pro (2000, 2002); 3× Pro Bowl (2000–2002); All-Big East (1992)

Career NFL statistics
- Games played: 173
- Games started: 142
- Fumble recoveries: 5
- Stats at Pro Football Reference

Ron Christopher Stone (born July 20, 1971) is an American former professional football player who was a guard in the National Football League (NFL) for the Dallas Cowboys, New York Giants, San Francisco 49ers and Oakland Raiders. He played college football for the Boston College Eagles.

== Early life ==
Stone is from Boston. He attended West Roxbury High School and did not play football until his junior year. He was a team captain and blocked three punts as a senior. He also played basketball as a senior.

He accepted a football scholarship from Boston College in Chestnut Hill, Massachusetts, to play under head coach Jack Bicknell. He was suspended because of academic reasons and did not play again until 1990, appearing in eight games at defensive tackle with 19 tackles, despite missing the last three games due to a fractured right ring finger.

In 1991, Tom Coughlin took over the team's coaching duties. Stone started 11 games at right defensive tackle, registering 49 tackles (five for a loss), a sack, two passes defensed and two blocked kicks. As a senior, he was asked to convert into a right tackle to improve the offensive line depth. The line was nicknamed "All State Insurance". He helped the offense rank 12th in the nation, average 233.5 rushing yards per game, and rank 10th in total offense with an average of 438.4 yards per game and surrender only 12 sacks

== Professional career ==
=== Dallas Cowboys ===
Stone was selected by the Dallas Cowboys in the fourth round (96th overall) of the 1993 NFL draft and was switched to play at offensive guard. He was activated for only four games as a rookie. The next year, he saw most of his playing time on the field goal and extra point lines.

During his time with the team he was a backup at guard and tackle. In 1994, during a playoff game against the Green Bay Packers, injuries forced him to play two different positions along the offensive line. Although he was a talented player and the top offensive line backup, he couldn't start ahead of the team's other offensive guards which included Nate Newton, Larry Allen, Kevin Gogan, John Gesek, and Derek Kennard. He was a part of two Super Bowl winning teams.

=== New York Giants ===
On March 1, 1996, the New York Giants signed him as an unrestricted free agent, when the Cowboys couldn’t match an offer which would pay him more than any of the Cowboys’ starters in the offensive line, except for offensive tackle Erik Williams. The contract at the time was criticized, because it was seen as overpaying for a player who was not proven and had no experience as a starter.

Stone spent six seasons with the Giants as the starter at right guard, where he was named to two Pro Bowls and two All-Pro teams.

=== San Francisco 49ers ===
On April 12, 2002, he signed with the San Francisco 49ers as an unrestricted free agent. He was the starter at right guard and made the Pro Bowl in his first year, despite playing the entire season with a right arm brace. In a salary cap move, he was released on March 2, 2004.

=== Oakland Raiders ===
On March 8, 2004, he signed with the Oakland Raiders, reuniting with former offensive coordinator Norv Turner, who was now the head coach of the team. He only started five games because of a left knee injury and was placed on the injured reserve list on December 31.

On March 4, 2005, he was waived and later re-signed on March 10. After starting all 16 games in the previous season, he was released on March 2, 2006.

== Post-NFL ==
After retiring from the NFL, Stone became the offensive line coach for Valley Christian High School in San Jose, California.

== Personal life ==
Stone has five children, four of them are athletes in different sports. His son, Ron Stone Jr., is a defensive end for the Columbus Aviators of the United Football League (2024-present) and two of his daughters were athletes at the University of Oregon in Eugene. His daughter Ronika played college volleyball and Ronna was a thrower on the track and field team. Ronnie did cheerleading. De`Ja is the eldest daughter.

Stone is the father-in-law of Green Bay Packers quarterback Jordan Love, who married Ronika in 2025.
