= Hôtel de Ville, Sainte-Foy-lès-Lyon =

Town hall in Sainte-Foy-lès-Lyon, France

Hôtel de Ville
- The main frontage of the Hôtel de Ville in April 2021
- Interactive map of the Hôtel de Ville area

General information
- Type: City hall
- Architectural style: Neoclassical style
- Location: Sainte-Foy-lès-Lyon, France
- Coordinates: 45.7364°N 4.7998°E
- Completed: 1882

Design and construction
- Architect: Henry de Champ

The Hôtel de Ville (French pronunciation: [otɛl də vil], City Hall) is a municipal building in Sainte-Foy-lès-Lyon, Metropolis of Lyon, in eastern France, standing on Rue Deshay.

== History ==
Following the French Revolution, the new town council initially met in the home of the mayor at the time. This arrangement continued until 1834, when the council established a combined town hall and school in Maison Chaunier on Grand Rue. Then, in 1887, the council purchased the Fanton Public House on Rue des Pompiers (now Rue Gensoul) to accommodate a new municipal building. The design involved an asymmetrical main frontage of three bays facing onto the street. There was a doorway on the left, and the building was fenestrated by casement windows on two floors and by a small window in the gable above. The building was significantly extended to the rear, to provide additional accommodation for council officers, in the first half of the 20th century.

In the late-1970s, following significant population growth, the council led by the mayor, Maurice Moulin, decided to acquire a more substantial municipal property. The property they selected was the Propriété Charbin on the west side of Rue Deshay. The building had been commissioned as a private residence for a silk manufacturer, Guillaume Blancard. It had been designed by Henry de Champ in the neoclassical style, built in ashlar stone and had been completed in 1882.

The design involved a symmetrical main frontage of seven bays facing west onto a park. The first two bays at either end were projected forward as pavilions with mansard roofs. There was a double forestair in front of the central section of three bays. The bays on the ground floor were fenestrated by casement windows with segmental pediments, while the bays on the first floor were fenestrated by casement windows with triangular pediments. At attic level, there was a dormer window above the central bay, with oculi on either side, and dormer windows projecting out of the two mansard roofs. In 1907, the house was acquired by a silk manufacturer, Étienne Charbin, and, in June 1977, it was acquired by the council for FFr2.3 million. The council initiated a major programme of refurbishment works which was completed in 1988.

A multi-functional municipal complex known as "Le Méridien" was designed and built by Archigroup on the opposite side of Rue Deshay in 2012. The complex incorporated a new two-screen cinema for Ciné Mourguet, which had been operating close by since 1988. The complex also incorporated a daycare centre, a community centre, and a new Salle du Conseil (council chamber) for meetings of members of the council.

A major programme of restoration work, involving the restoration of the town hall stonework as well as internal refurbishment, was completed in May 2018.
