= Boston Schoolyard Initiative =

Boston Schoolyard Initiative (BSI) is a public–private partnership that works to transform the conditions of public schoolyards of Boston Public Schools. BSI, in collaboration with private funders, the City of Boston and Boston Public Schools, uses a community participatory design process to change neglected and unwelcome schoolyards into centers for active school and community use.

== History ==
Boston Schoolyard Initiative was created in 1995, following community concern and complaint about the conditions in neglected schoolyards. After comprehensive site assessments and outreach to stakeholders including community residents, environmental groups, educators and city officials, a Task Force under leadership of Mayor Thomas Menino recommended the establishment of BSI. The private sector part of the BSI partnerships is a group of philanthropies called the Boston Schoolyard Funders Collaborative.

As a result of this collaborative effort, BSI has renovated 74 schoolyards into places for active play with modern and safe play equipment and play surfaces. In 2004, observing the need and opportunity to create stronger connections between everyday curriculum and the outdoor environment, the BSI began developing, through a pilot program, concepts and designs for Outdoor Classrooms within schoolyards. The BSI has designed and created 26 Outdoor Classrooms for K-5 schools and 2 in High Schools.

== Educational use of schoolyards ==
Teachers unfamiliar with working with students outside the school classroom may be concerned that if they take students outside they will lose control of student attention and focus. Through evaluation of student and teacher use of renovated schoolyards and Outdoor Classrooms, the BSI has developed methods to enhance the use of the outdoors in schoolyards to support required school curriculum.

Professional development workshops and the writing of curriculum are used by BSI to connect programs in science and literacy to the Schoolyard and Outdoor Classroom. Both the schoolyard and Outdoor Classroom have been shown to be a valuable expansion of the learning environment in Boston Public Schools.

The Boston Schoolyard Initiative supports the design process with a community based Schoolyard Design Workbook, and protocols for maintenance and sustainable use of schoolyards. BSI works with school communities to help schoolyards to become places for Environmental education; summer educational programs; health, fitness and wellness programs; and in some cases sites for community gardening.

== See also ==
- Outdoor education
- Nature deficit disorder
