= Youth service =

Socially positive activity engaged in by young people

Youth service refers to non-military, intensive engagement of young people in organized activity that contributes to the local, national, or world community. Youth service is widely recognized and valued by society, with minimal or no compensation to the server. Youth service also provides opportunities for youth development, youth voice and reflection. This may take the form of a youth program where young people are recruited, offered leadership opportunities, participate in activities that improve the community, and are trained and mentored.

== Definitions ==
The general definition of community service does not vary; however, the understanding of what youth is varies by country. The most common age group defined as ‘youth’ is 15-30 years of age. The United Nations defines youth as 15-24 years of age. The variation of whether or not youth service is "long range" depends on the setting. Some communities regard long-range youth service as being from six months to two years of service; however, this time range can vary with each country’s national youth service policy.

== Configurations ==
There are various types of youth service programs worldwide. Servicio Social in Mexico is a required community service program for all Mexican university students. Students must serve 480 hours of voluntary activity over the course of a four-year undergraduate education. The goal is to build solidarity among youths and increase collaboration in community development. The National Youth Commission in South Africa is a national youth service program and government-sponsored national youth service program that enlists youth in combating the spread of HIV/AIDS and in reducing youth unemployment. Servicio País in Chile is a competitive selection civil service program for university graduates with the goal of decreasing rural poverty. Select professions are recruited to the program such as lawyers, engineers, and medical professionals. If chosen, graduates serve 13 months in a rural area. They practice their professions and also build relationships with local people. Other programs include Servicio País, YouthBuild USA and City Year.

== See also ==
- Service learning
- Volunteering
- National service
- AmeriCorps
- Global Youth Action Network
- Youth Service America
- One World Youth Project
- buildon
- Katimavik
