= Outdoor Education Group =

Australian non-profit organisation

The Outdoor Education Group (OEG) is an Australian non-profit organisation which runs school camp programs across the country. Tony Pammer founded the company in 1984. It is based in Eildon, Victoria.

== History ==
The Outdoor Education Group (OEG) was founded by Tony Pammer in 1984. For many private schools, OEG offered a third-party alternative to programs such as Geelong Grammar's Timbertop. By 2008, The Age reported that OEG at least partially ran over 80 schools' outdoor education programs, 42 of which were in Victoria. OEG's main competitor is Outward Bound Australia, which serves a smaller number of schools.

In 2005, a Toorak College student died during an OEG camp at Snowy River National Park after strong winds caused a tree branch to fall on her tent. Pammer said it was OEG's first ever casualty and that an auditor would examine the safety of the camp. Outdoor education companies cited by The Age agreed that the accident was unforeseeable and a Toorak College spokesperson said they would continue to use OEG.
