= Inter-Switch Link =

Inter-Switch Link can stand for:

- The link joining of two Fibre Channel switches through E_ports
- Cisco Inter-Switch Link (ISL) is a proprietary protocol that maintains VLAN information as traffic flows between switches and routers.
