= Iranian Super League =

Iranian Super League may refer to:

- Futsal Super League
- Iranian Basketball Super League
- Iranian Volleyball Super League
