= International School of Lyon =

English language school in France

Location
- 80 Chemin du Grand Roule, Ste.-Foy-Lès-Lyon, France; 45.7295°N 4.8063°E

Information
- Established: March 2004
- Website: www.islyon.org

International School of Lyon (ISL) is an English-Language international school in Sainte Foy-Lès-Lyon, France, near Lyon. The school serves preschool (beginning at age 2) through senior high school. It was established in March 2004.
