= Service-learning =

Pedagogy combining learning objectives with community service

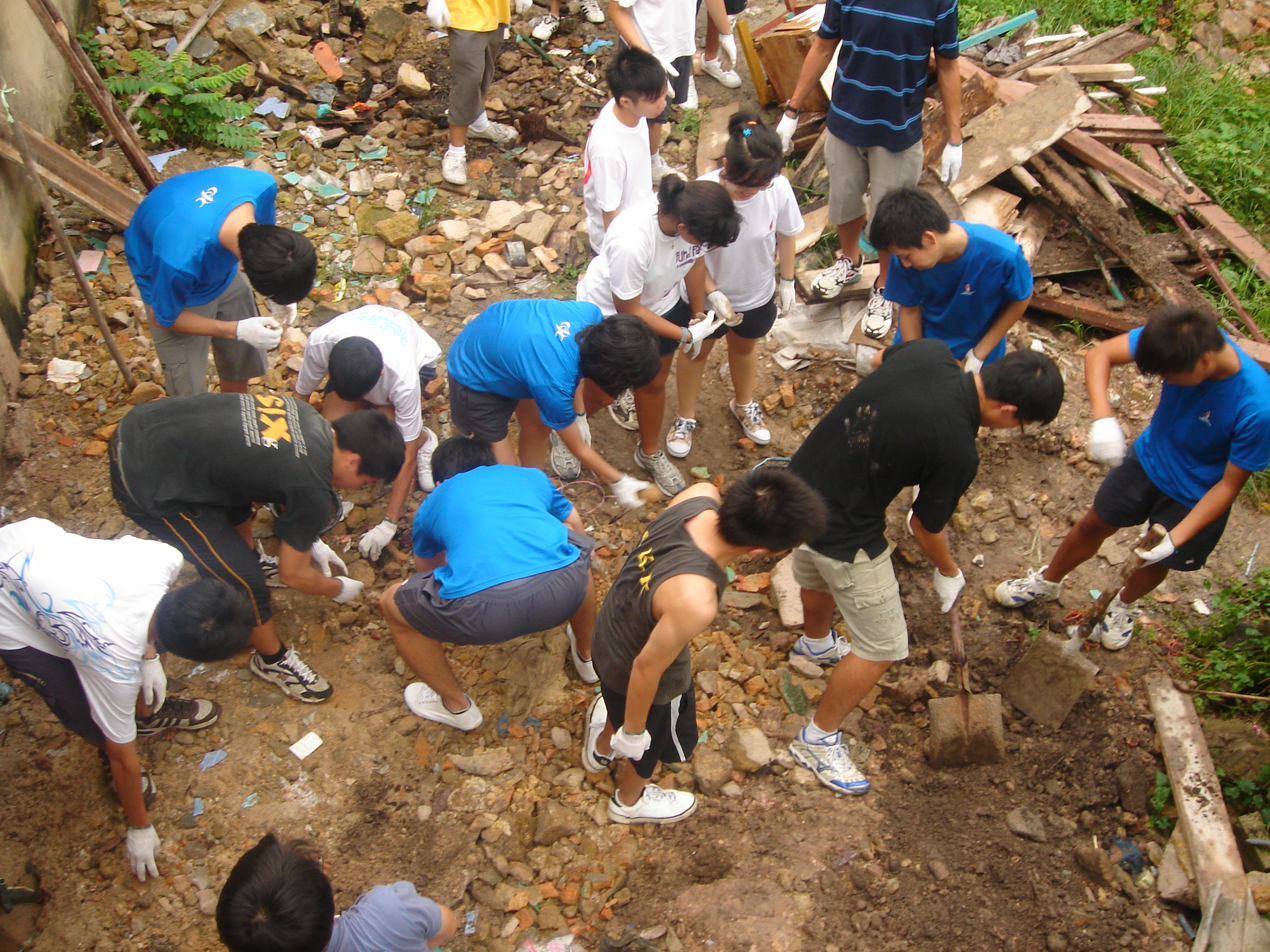
A Service Learning Project at Butam organized by MaxPac Travel for Catholic Junior College students. January 15, 2009. Tay Yong Seng.

Service-learning is an educational approach that uses community service to meet both classroom learning objectives and societal needs. It has been used with students of all grades and stages. Projects based in communities are designed to apply classroom learning to create positive change in the community and often involve community organisations.

Service learning combines experiential learning and community service.

== Definitions ==
According to Andrew Furco, service-learning "occurs when there is a balance between learning goals and service outcomes." Other authors, including the National Youth Leadership Council, emphasize the same balance. Robert Sigmon conceives the variety of service-learning projects found on college campuses in terms of variations in that balance: i.e. whether learning goals or service goals are primary, secondary, of equal importance, or completely separate.

The student is also expected to learn by acting in the world and reflecting on the results of their action. As a process of learning, this has long-established theoretical and empirical bases. According to Barbara Jacoby, therefore, service-learning "is based on the work of researchers and theorists on learning, including John Dewey, Jean Piaget, Kurt Lewin, Donald Schon, and David Kolb, who believe that people learn through combinations of action and reflection." Related areas of academic practice, such as Action Research and Reflective Practice, emphasize the relationship between learner and community, or researcher and researched, with a view to creating change beyond the school, rather than only creating knowledge.

== History ==
The term "service-learning" originated in and spread from the US and is often discussed in the context of American colleges and schools. Much of its history is therefore American.

=== In American education ===
In one early account, in the late 1960s federal monies were used for a service-learning internship model by the Southern Regional Education Board. By 1979 the same author claimed "service learning" was being used to describe a number of different volunteer actions and experiential education programs. From 1995 to 1997, 458 universities received grants from the Corporation for National Service under the Learn and Serve Higher Education scheme (see Learn and Serve America), helping create 3,000 new service-learning courses with an average of more than 60 students per course. In 1992, Maryland and the District of Columbia adopted statewide service-learning requirements for high school graduation. In 2014 The National Center for Learning and Civic Engagement surveyed all states for their service-learning policies. However, while service-learning was well-established in American higher education institutions by 2008, it was to be found in less than 30% of K–12 schools according to Furco and Root.

== Applications & contexts ==
There are several documented models of service-learning, such as the Comprehensive Action Plan for Service Learning. There are variants that focus on particular elements or purposes, such as "critical service learning" which emphasizes political and social power relations in marginalized communities. Recent attention has been paid to online service-learning or eService-Learning.

Service-learning has been used in multiple academic and community contexts. For example, it has been used in and by native American and other potentially marginalized communities. And it has been used within academic specialisms, such as history, sociology, language-learning, and engineering.

== Benefits ==
The benefits of service-learning for the participating student are better-documented than the benefits to the communities in which the service occurs.

=== Students' development ===
Students have reported developing personal leadership skills, skills in working with others, including greater interaction with faculty, and the development of more meaning and purpose in study. Academically, there is evidence of improved understanding of classroom studies, the application of theory, critical thinking and analysis. Other personal growth outcomes may include self-knowledge, spiritual growth, the reward of helping others, career benefits including careers in service, and changes in personal efficacy

Experience in communities may result in experience of different cultures. In one survey of service-learning students, "57 percent reported that they had frequent chances to work with people from ethnic groups other than their own." Advocates of service-learning argue that this can help students learn to appreciate their shared humanity and more effectively serve a broader array of people.

=== Community development ===
Service-learning contributes to the presence of more volunteers, which enables community organizations to do more and to serve more clients. Students may supply specific skills they possess to benefit the organization, and can be a source of new ideas, energy, and enthusiasm. Through partnering with a college or university, a community organization can gain access to new knowledge and opportunities to connect with other organizations that have partnered with the same school.

Service-learning may motivate individuals to become better citizens of their communities by cultivating civic and social responsibility, and through the development of personal relationships. A service-learning experience may be the catalyst in the life of a student to dive into the complexities of the social issues they have encountered and to seek to develop innovative solutions.

Recent studies have proven its use in citizen coexistence as a strategy to foster intercultural coexistence in local communities, which is essential for successfully implementing socio-educational interventions.

== Critiques ==
Service-learning has been the subject of debate throughout its history. It has been criticized for not generating useful skills, nor meaningful cultural or community knowledge, nor doing much for the community itself, and instead mostly inculcating communitarian political ideologies in students and focusing on the student's "good deeds”. Without deeper critical reflection the effect may be to maintain, rather than subvert, systems of community oppression. "Critical service-learning" claims to address some of these issues (see Applications & Contexts, above).

It has also been described as "a utopian vision". University policies that mandate service learning have been criticized as the imposition of intellectual conformity by means of identifying specific types of civic engagement as worthy community service and thus prescribing social and political perspectives, contrary to the ideal of the university as a site for the pursuit of truth through the free exchange of ideas.

The relationship between community and academy is an area of general critique. Communication with faculty is often inconsistent, so community organizations do not always understand their roles and the roles of the faculty in students' service projects. Some organizations' representatives have stated that faculty assigned students projects that were not allowed in their organization. And the small number of hours students are required to spend volunteering can cause problems for community organizations and their clients. Even research about service-learning is mostly done by scholars rather than community locals and organizations.

== Factors in effectiveness ==
Research into service-learning claims to have identified a number of factors that determine its effectiveness. These include:

- placement "quality" (level of student challenge, responsibility, activity and sense of positive involvement and instructor/supervisor feedback)
- team dynamics
- placement and program duration (long enough to have a developmental impact)
- quality of student reflection, often as activity (e.g. brainstorming) and/or in written form(e.g. journaling)

== Notable people ==
Alexander Astin, founding director of the Cooperative Institutional Research Program and the Higher Education Research Institute, formed a Theory of Involvement which explains how student involvement in co-curricular activities positively affects college outcomes. Through a 1998 study of college seniors, Astin demonstrated that service greatly improves critical thinking skills.

Nadinne I. Cruz: works as an independent consultant. She gained enthusiasm for the cause of service learning through her work in the Philippines. Now, she is an advocate of service learning who argues that only a small portion of skills needed to address life's problems can be learned through traditional academia. Other skills, such as courage, forgiveness, and stewarding the earth, must be learned elsewhere. Therefore, she recommends service learning and community engagement, which “offer learning with and from wise people, who teach by example.”

Andrew Furco: Associate Vice President for Public Engagement at the University of Minnesota and a professor. Furco has contributed a variety of literature to service learning, including two books: Service-Learning: The Essence of the Pedagogy and Service-Learning Through a Multidisciplinary Lens, which he co-authored with S. Billig. He gives five reasons engagement programs differ from engaged universities: “Engagement differs from outreach… is at the heart of the university’s identity… focuses on partnerships… is with, not to, for, or in communities… is about institutional transformation.”

James Kielsmeier: Founded the National Youth Leadership Council, a nonprofit that became the service-learning movement. Kielsmeier posits that service learning involves a change in how schools see young people: from “resource users, recipients, and victims” to “contributors, givers, and leaders.”

== See also ==
- Campus Compact
- Constructivism
- Cooperative education
- Global Leadership Adventures
- International Service Learning
- Learn and Serve America
- Lifeworks International
- National service
- National Service Learning Conference
- Out-of-school learning
- Public sphere pedagogy
- Youth Service America
