= International Service Learning =

- Type: Private
- Founded: 1996
- Headquarters: Spokane, Washington, U.S.
- Key people: Jonathan Birnbaum, Executive Director
- Revenue: $3.7 million (2014)
- Number of employees: 200
- Website: www.islonline.org

International Service Learning, founded in 1996, is a non-governmental organization that offers medical volunteers two to three week placements in twelve countries: Belize, Colombia, Costa Rica, Cuba, Dominican Republic, Haiti, Jamaica, Mexico, Nicaragua, Panama, Peru, and Tanzania. The company is led by Jonathan Birnbaum, executive director, in Spokane, Washington.

Volunteers participate on nine to fourteen day trips that are self-funded.
