= Alec Dickson =

British activist

Dr Alexander Graeme Dickson CBE (23 May 1914 – 23 September 1994) was the founder of Voluntary Service Overseas (VSO).

Dickson graduated from Oxford University in 1935 and worked as a foreign correspondent in Central Europe during the rise of Hitler. He also helped groups of young people in the slums of Leeds and London. The Nazi occupation of Czechoslovakia resulted in Dickson working in refugee relief. Reportedly, his name was number 57 on a list of those to be arrested by the Gestapo. After the war, Dickson spent 15 years in Africa, the Middle East and South East Asia, training indigenous young people as community leaders and animateurs.

In 1951, Dickson married writer, artist and campaigner Mora Dickson (née Robertson) (20 April 1918 – 17 December 2001), author of A Chance To Serve (1976) recounting the beginnings of VSO.

The Dicksons worked with refugees on the Austro-Hungarian frontier in 1956-57; this inspired them to found Voluntary Service Overseas (VSO) in 1958. VSO was created to send volunteers to developing countries, and Dickson's idea came from his own "Christian but non-denominational faith". The first 16 volunteers went to Sarawak, Ghana, Nigeria and Zambia having responded to an article in The Sunday Times, written by Alec Dickson but credited to Lancelot Fleming, then Bishop of Portsmouth.

On leaving VSO in 1962, the Dicksons formed Community Service Volunteers, which focused on UK-based volunteer projects.

The Alec Dickson Trust was established after Dickson's death in 1994. It "supports young people who, through volunteering or community service, aim to enhance the lives of others, particularly those most marginalised by society".

== Awards ==
Dickson became a MBE in 1945 and a CBE in 1967. A plaque marking the London house where he died was erected by the Bedford Park Society.

Dickson was an honorary National Youth Leadership Council (NYLC) Board Member.

An NYLC award was named after him: Alec Dickson Servant Leader Award, awarded to "exemplary leaders who have inspired the service-learning field, positively impacting the lives of young people, and motivating others to take up the banner of service"
