= National Service Learning Conference =

Conference in the United States

The National Service-Learning Conference was first held in 1988 to serve as "the largest gathering of youth and practitioners from the service-learning movement" of the United States. The conference is a program of the National Youth Leadership Council, and is co-hosted annually by partner organizations in the state or region where it is being held. Sponsors of the conference include United Parcel Service, Best Buy, Shinnyo-en Foundation, United Way of America, and E. Ronald and Patricia Parish.

The conference focuses on service-learning, an approach to teaching and learning in which students use academic knowledge and skills to address genuine community needs. Annually, the National Service-Learning Conference convenes teachers and other service-learning practitioners, administrators, researchers, policy-makers, youth leaders, parents, program coordinators, national service members, community-based organization staffs, and corporate and foundation officers. The conference is unique because typically youth comprise more than half its attendees and are treated as equal contributors. Youth present, exhibit, and attend the three-and-a-half-day event same as their adult counterparts.

Each year the conference features over 200 workshop sessions, thought-leader sessions, keynote addresses, an interactive exhibit hall with a service-learning showcase and college fair, both on- and off-site service-learning projects to allow participants an authentic learning opportunity, an administrator's academy, indigenous service-learning forum, preconference sessions for in-depth learning, as well as countless networking and professional development opportunities. Speakers from around the world present on international issues and help to ground the conference in a rapidly globalizing world. Artists, students, and community members from the host locale contribute to the ambiance of the conference each year. The hallways, exhibit hall aisles, and general spaces are transformed with spoken word, drumming, murals, paintings, etc. The conference takes on the culture of the city that hosts it, from the local food that is served to service projects that provide a deeper understanding of the host city.

For 2012, the conference was co-hosted with youthrive, the upper midwest affiliate of PeaceJam, and presented as The 23rd Annual National Service-Learning Conference & youthrive PeaceJam Leadership Conference. In addition to the full range of conference workshops and activities, the partnership with youthrive PeaceJam brought Nobel Laureate Shirin Ebadi as a featured speaker, and the week-long event ended with a celebration of Global Youth Service Day at the Mall of America.

The Service-Learning World Forum began in 2008 as a pre-conference session of the larger conference and is now an integral program of the larger conference. The World Forum engages attendees with international leaders, exploring youth service and service-learning as forces that span cultural and national boundaries, building communities and strengthening young people. World Forum attendees discover how service-learning is implemented from Ireland, to Argentina, to the Middle East, and is useful for both those working internationally and those interested in expanding their programs.

Each year since 2003 the conference has highlighted the National Service-Learning Awards. Awards are presented to leaders in the field of service-learning, both youths and adults. In 2006 the first William James National Service Lifetime Achievement Award was presented by the National Youth Leadership Council in conjunction with several leading service organizations. The award was given to former Senator Harris Wofford and presented by President Bill Clinton, Kathleen Kennedy Townsend, and Dr. James Kielsmeier. Since its inception, the conference has planted trees in each city that has hosted the event, in honor of the service-learning award winners.

The October 2009 issue of One+ magazine featured a four-page article highlighting the conference and its commitment to the community. One+ magazine is the official publication of Meeting Planners International. One+ is the leading voice of the meeting and event industry, reaching 30,000+ industry professionals on six continents.

== List of conferences ==
Conference	Location	Date	Theme
33rd	Minneapolis, Minnesota & Virtual	April 20-22 & 27, 2022	Together.
32nd	Virtual	April 14-15, 2021	Engage. Evolve. Energize!
31st	Virtual	April 16-17, 2020	Unmask Your Potential
30th	Philadelphia, Pennsylvania	April 14-16, 2019	Nurturing Learners, Growing Leaders
29th	St. Paul, Minnesota	March 11-13, 2018	Justice in Action
28th	Anaheim, California	March 22-24, 2017	Dare to Dream
27th	Minneapolis, Minnesota	March 30-April 2, 2016	Educate. Ignite. Transform.
26th	Washington D.C.	April 8–11, 2015	More Powerful Together
25th	Washington D.C.	April 9–11, 2014	MONUMENTAL
24th	Denver, Colorado	March 13–15, 2013	Without Limits
23rd	Minneapolis, Minnesota	April 11–16, 2012	Our World Our Future
22nd	Atlanta, Georgia	April 6–9, 2011	The Time is Now!
21st	San Jose, California	March 24–28, 2010	Inspire, Imagine, Innovate!
20th	Nashville, Tennessee	March 18–21, 2009	Growing Hope, Cultivating Change
19th	Minneapolis, Minnesota	April 9–12, 2008	Youth for a Change
18th	Albuquerque, New Mexico	March 28–31, 2007	Beyond Borders, Beyond Boundaries
17th	Philadelphia, Pennsylvania	2006	We The People
16th	Long Beach, California	2005	Educating for Change
15th	Orlando, Florida	2004	Citizens not Spectators: Fulfilling the Promise of Democracy
14th	Minneapolis, Minnesota	2003	Weaving the Fabric of Community: A Celebration of Service-Learning
13th	Seattle, Washington	2002	Reflecting on the Past, Envisioning the Future
12th	Denver, Colorado	2001	Partnerships for a Civil Society
11th	Providence, Rhode Island	2000	Leadership for the Common Good
10th	San Jose, California	1999	Powerful Connections for the 21st Century
9th	Minneapolis, Minnesota	1998	One World: Youth at the Center
8th	Orlando, Florida	1997	Coming Together to Create a Brighter Tomorrow
7th	Detroit, Michigan	1996	A Gathering of Many Voices...Each Voice Counts
6th	Philadelphia, Pennsylvania	1995	Service-Learning: Integrating Schools and Communities for Learning
5th	Albuquerque, New Mexico	1994	Leadership for Community Renewal
4th	Minneapolis, Minnesota	1993	Facing the Challenge: Revitalizing Education, Renewing Community
3rd	Everett, Washington	1992	Experience the Power
2nd	Minneapolis, Minnesota	1991	Generating Change: The Power of Service-Learning - Community Renewal and Education Reform
1st	Minneapolis, Minnesota	1989	Growing Hope: Strengthening Education and Building Communities

== Past speakers ==
Conference	Location	Speaker(s)
25th	Washington D.C.	Arne Duncan, Sandra Day O'Connor, Anthony Foxx, Sally Jewell, Harris Wofford
23rd	Minneapolis, Minnesota	Shirin Ebadi, Geoffrey Canada
22nd	Atlanta, Georgia	Greg Mortenson
21st	San Jose, California	Sir Ken Robinson, Talia Leman, Carol Bellamy
20th	Nashville, Tennessee	Dr. James Hildreth
19th	Minneapolis, Minnesota	Archbishop Desmond Tutu
18th	Albuquerque, New Mexico	Jane Goodall
17th	Philadelphia, Pennsylvania	President Bill Clinton, Gerda Weissmann Klein, Hafsat Abiola
16th	Long Beach, California	Erin Gruwell

== See also ==
- Service-learning
- National Youth Leadership Council
