= National Youth Leadership Council =

National nonprofit organization

- Logo of National Youth Leadership Council
- Abbreviation: NYLC
- Formation: 1983
- Type: Youth organization
- Legal status: Non-profit organization
- Headquarters: St. Paul, MN
- Location: United States
- CEO: Amy Meuers
- Website: www.nylc.org

The National Youth Leadership Council (NYLC) is a national nonprofit organization located in Saint Paul, Minnesota, that promotes service-learning in schools and communities across the United States. Founded in 1983 by Dr. James Kielsmeier, NYLC is the host of the annual National Service-Learning Conference. The organization is a proponent of service-learning and national service in the United States.

== History ==
Founded in 1983, to "create a more just, sustainable, and peaceful world with young people, their schools, and their communities through service-learning". The National Youth Leadership Council began hosting the National Service-Learning Conference in 1989. In 1993 the organization became the main training and technical assistance for the Corporation for National Service focused on service learning.

=== Programs ===
NYLC publishes an annual research publication, Growing to Greatness, that seeks to document the scope, scale, and impacts of service-learning. An edition has been published each year since 2004. Each edition features a series of topical research articles from leading scholars in the field as well as qualitative profiles of several U.S. states and territories and, increasingly, state-by-state data on service-learning and positive youth contributions.

In 2008, NYLC released the K–12 Service-Learning Standards for Quality Practice that detail the eight standards of quality service-learning, with three to five accompanying indicators for each standard. The standards are the result of a national review process that began with research from the field and vetted the previously published Essential Elements of Service-Learning through a series of reactor panels to arrive at the final document.

== See also ==
- Youth service
- Service-learning
- National Service-Learning Conference
- Youth voice
