= List of youth parliaments =

This is a list of youth parliaments. Youth governments or youth councils are a form of youth civic engagement in community decision-making.

== Europe ==
- Vlaams Jeugd Parlement, Flemish Youth Parliament, a simulation of the Flemish Parliament in Belgium
- Youth Parliament (Greece), a Greek youth organization
- Parlement Jeunesse de la Fédération Wallonie-Bruxelles, a simulation of the Federation Wallonie-Bruxelles Parliament in Belgium
- Jeugd Parlement Jeunesse, a simulation of the federal parliament of Belgium
- SPECQUE, a simulation of the European level

=== United Kingdom ===
- UK Youth Parliament, British organization of directly or indirectly elected young representatives
- Welsh Youth Parliament, democratically elected Welsh youth model legisture
- Scottish Youth Parliament, a democratically elected Scottish youth legislature.
- Northern Ireland Youth Assembly, an appointed Northern Ireland youth legislature.

== North America ==
=== United States ===
- YMCA Youth and Government, a US youth parliament
- Unicameral Youth Legislature, a youth parliament in Nebraska

=== Canada ===
- Youth Parliament of Canada, a Canadian youth parliament
- TUXIS Parliament of Alberta, a Canadian youth parliament
- British Columbia Youth Parliament, a Canadian youth parliament
- Youth Parliament of Manitoba, a Canadian youth parliament
- Maritime Youth Parliament, a Canadian youth parliament
- Newfoundland and Labrador Youth Parliament, a Canadian youth parliament
- Ontario Youth Parliament, a number of Canadian youth parliaments
- Parlement Jeunesse du Québec, a Canadian youth parliament
- Saskatchewan Youth Parliament, a Canadian youth parliament
- Western Canada Youth Parliament, a biannual youth parliament consisting of the four western Canadian youth parliaments
- Yukon Youth Parliament, a Canadian youth parliament
- Northwest Territories Youth Parliament, a Canadian youth parliament
- Nunavut Youth Parliament, a Canadian youth parliament

=== Caribbean ===
- National Youth Parliament of Jamaica
- Kingston & St.Andrew Municipal Corporation Junior Council
- National Youth Assembly Bahamas
- Grenada National Youth Parliament
- Barbados National Youth Parliament
- National Youth Parliament of Dominica

== Asia ==
- Youth Parliament of Malaysia, a youth council and parliament in Malaysia
- The YP Foundation, an Indian support organization for youth
- Youth Parliament Program, an Indian support organization for youth
- Youth Parliament of Pakistan, a Pakistani project to engage youth to the democratic process and practices
- Afghan Youth Parliament, an Afghan organization of young representatives
- National Youth Council, a Nepali government wing to engage youth to the parliamentary procedure and to enhance youth in entrepreneurship development, strengthening democracy, creating opportunities and goals.

== Oceania ==
- New Zealand Youth Parliament, an triennial youth parliament event in New Zealand
- YMCA NSW Youth Parliament, a New South Wales youth parliament
- YMCA Queensland Youth Parliament, a Queensland youth parliament
- YMCA Youth Parliament, there is a YMCA Youth Parliament in every State and Territory in Australia

== Association of countries ==
- The Commonwealth Youth Parliament, model parliament of delegates from over 53 countries
- Model UN Youth Summit, youth conference of countries of the United Nations engaging youth in worldwide issues
- Model NATO Youth Summit, transatlantic conference of countries of NATO engaging youth in international military-security issues
- Model Arab League, youth conference of countries of the Arab League on US-Arab relations
- European Youth Parliament, a ngo to encourage opinion forming and political engagement by youth
  - European Youth Parliament - Ireland
  - European Youth Parliament – Ukraine
  - European Youth Parliament Belgium
