= Newfoundland and Labrador Youth Parliament =

Youth non-profit organization

The Newfoundland and Labrador Youth Parliament (NLYP) is one of a number of provincial youth model parliaments across Canada.

== Background ==
The Newfoundland and Labrador Youth Parliament (NLYP) is a non-partisan, non-profit organization, run entirely by youth, and dedicated to bringing the experience of parliamentary democracy to the youth of the province of Newfoundland and Labrador.

The aims of the NLYP are to educate youth about the institutions of Parliament and the rights and responsibilities of citizenship in a democracy, to provide a forum for youth on issues concerning society, and to help youth develop their skills in public speaking and debate.

The House of Assembly of the NLYP meets in Session once a year. Its Members range in age from about 15 to 24 and come from all over Newfoundland and Labrador. In session, a Government introduces resolutions on various issues. The resolutions are critiqued by the Opposition, and ultimately debated and voted on by the Members. Individual Members are also able to present their own resolutions on both serious and light topics.

In Youth Parliament, Members are free to vote as they see fit. The absence of party lines is the single biggest difference between Youth Parliament and actual legislatures. The Government and Opposition blocs are made up of only the Cabinet and Shadow Cabinet, which are small and equal in size. All other Members are independent and thus hold the balance of power. The NLYP follows its own Acts of Parliament (bylaws) and Standing Orders (rules of Procedure). It also relies on the Standing Orders and practices of the House of Assembly and House of Commons, and reference texts like Beauchesne's Rules and Forms of the House of Commons of Canada, to make judgments on procedural matters.

The Acts of Parliament governing the operation of the NLYP are established by passing bills in the Parliament, using a process similar to that of Canadian legislatures. This way, constitutional authority over the organization is held by the youth who participate in it.

The Members are also responsible for electing persons to the board of directors after every session, who then in turn choose from among themselves the Executive officers.

The NLYP also has a Senate, whose members are Youth Parliament alumni. Senators are appointed by the House, usually being alumni who have distinguished themselves during their participation in Youth Parliament.

Regional Youth Parliaments typically hold sessions twice a year in various regions of the province. Although each is self-governing, they observe many of the same parliamentary rules and practices as the NLYP. Each Regional Youth Parliament also contributes one member to the board.

== Foundations ==
The Newfoundland and Labrador Youth Parliament is one of many mock parliament organizations Canada-wide, all with a common heritage. In the beginning of the 20th century, the Boys' Work movement of the YMCA began, promoting physical, mental, spiritual and social development of young Christian men. One very important, and continuing component of this movement was the Canadian Standard Efficiency Training, which incorporated the "Trail Rangers" and "TUXIS" programs. "TUXIS" - meaning Training for Service with Christ in the centre, you and I on either side, and no one but Christ between us - is the foundation of the mock parliaments created by the YMCA. Starting as a conference in which the boys of the Boys' Work programs could participate directly in determining the objectives of the group's program. The first confirmed of these style mock parliaments was held in Ontario in 1917, under the name of the Ontario Older Boys' Parliament, and followed a similar format as seen today.

As the idea began to gain popularity, TUXIS and Older Boys' Parliaments began to crop up in nearly every province. Gradually the YMCA withdrew its involvement, and the parliaments evolved into autonomous entities.

Today Youth Parliaments exist in many of the provinces, with Newfoundland being the only of the Atlantic. Each of these parliaments, although they do share the same origin, have varying focuses. The Newfoundland and Labrador Youth Parliament and La Parlement Jeunesse du Quebec have a primary interest in social and political interests, while the British Columbia Youth Parliament has a very strong commitment to other forms of community service. The last Youth Parliament in Canada to retain its TUXIS designation was that of Alberta; it now meets as the Alberta Youth Parliament. In addition to the provincial Youth Parliaments, the four westernmost provinces hold a Western Canada Youth Parliament annually.

== Youth Parliament in Newfoundland ==
The Newfoundland and Labrador Youth Parliament first met in 1960 as the "Older Boys’ Parliament of Newfoundland". In 1967, the Older Boys’ Parliament of Newfoundland changed its name to the Newfoundland Youth Parliament and made provisions for girls to be allowed to sit as members, the first in the country to do so. The Newfoundland Youth Parliament had a brief hiatus in the late 1970s, but has since reconstituted itself. The organization has also since changed its name again, to the present Newfoundland and Labrador Youth Parliament.

The NLYP holds an annual session every year. At the yearly session, delegates are assigned a provincial riding to represent, although not necessarily the one in which they reside. Currently, young people in grade ten up to and including 24 years of age are permitted to attend the NLYP, which meets in the House of Assembly in St. John's, Newfoundland and Labrador.

The NLYP was one of the provincial youth parliaments that founded and participated in the Youth Parliament of Canada/Parlement jeunesse du Canada.

== Senate ==
In the long-standing history of the Newfoundland and Labrador Youth Parliament, many youth parliamentarians have made great contributions to the organization. In honour of their contributions, upon their retirement from the organization some of these members are given the title of Senator. This honorary position is a lifelong testament to the work the Senator has done in enhancing the quality of each session during their careers as youth parliamentarians.

As of the 58th session of the Newfoundland and Labrador Youth Parliament, 60 people have been given this honour.
