= YMCA Youth and Government =

Model government for young people

- Formation: 1936; 90 years ago
- Founder: Clement A. Duran
- Founded at: New York, United States
- Purpose: Activism, civic engagement
- Headquarters: Washington, D.C., United States
- Parent organization: YMCA of the USA
- Website: www.ymcayag.org

YMCA Youth and Government (YAG), also known as Youth In Government, or Model Legislature and Court, is a program of the YMCA of the USA that allows middle and high school students to serve in model governments at the local, state, national, and international levels.

The YMCA Youth and Government program currently operates in all 50 states and Washington, DC.

Each state may participate in the national programs, which include: the YMCA Youth Conference on National Affairs (CONA), YMCA National Judicial Competition, YMCA Youth Governors Conference (YGC), YMCA Youth Advocate Program, and YMCA Changemakers Summit.

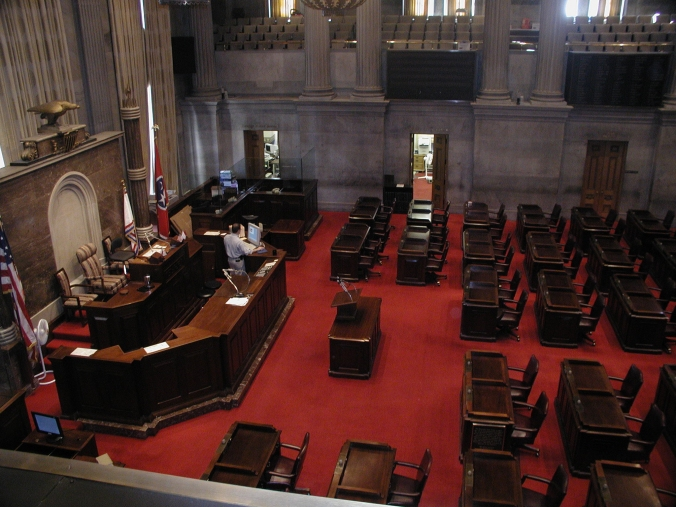
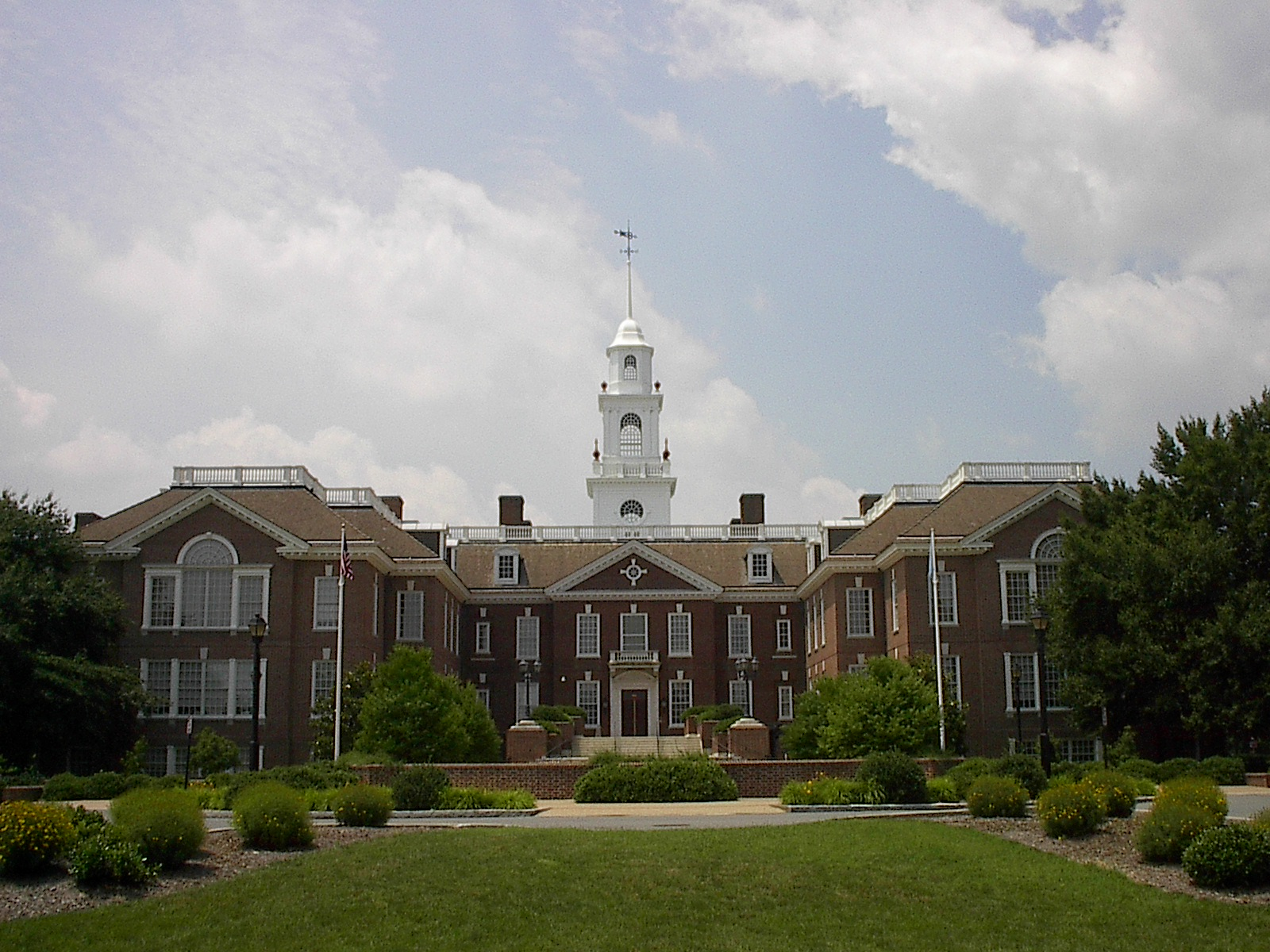

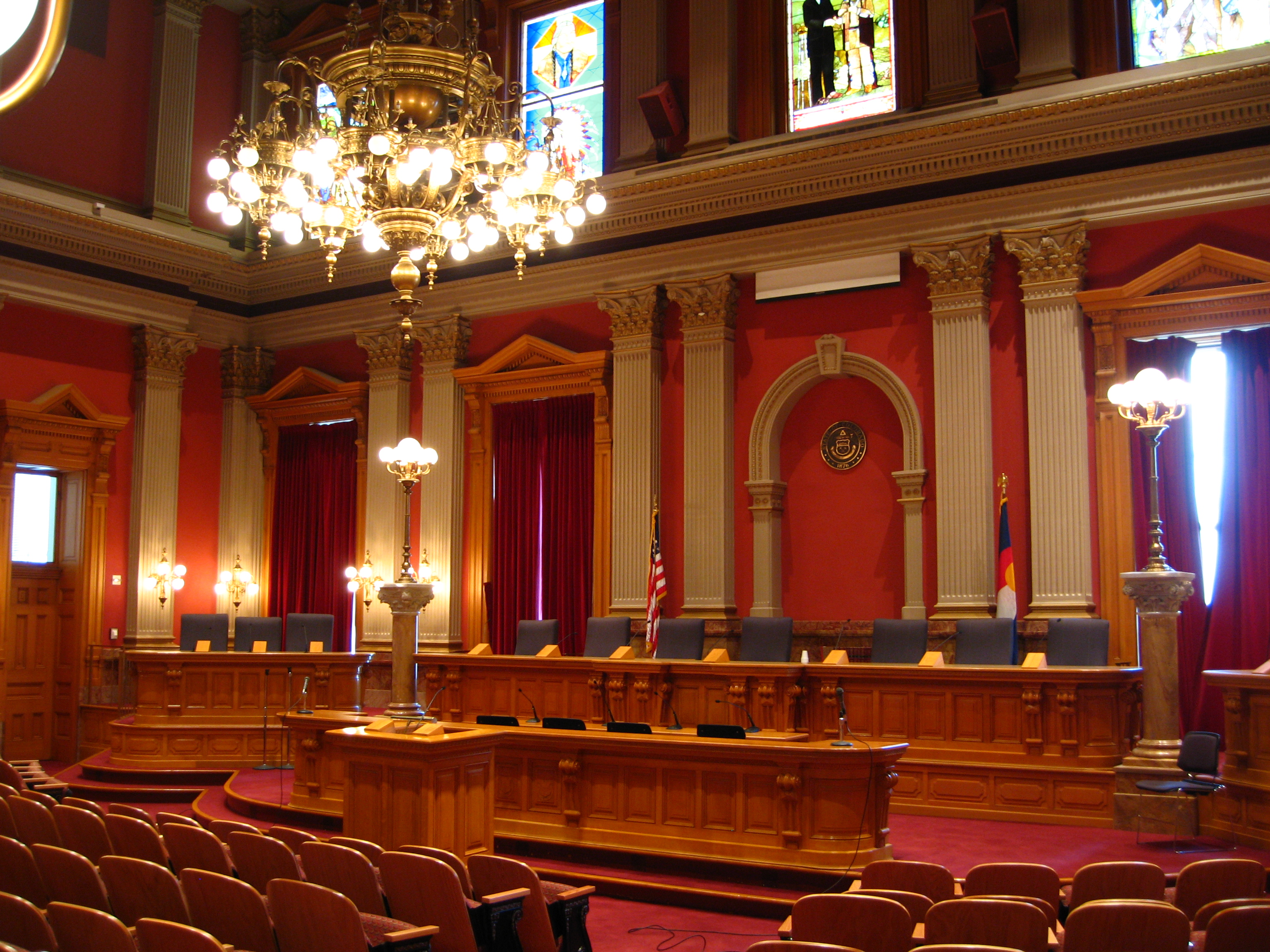
Annual YMCA Youth and Government sessions often occur in State Capitol buildings, House or Senate Chambers or Supreme Court Chambers.

== History ==
The YMCA Youth and Government program was established in 1936 in New York by Clement A. Duran, then the Boys Work Secretary for the Albany YMCA. The program motto, “Democracy must be learned by each generation,” was taken from a quote by Earle T. Hawkins, the founder of the Maryland Youth and Government program.

In 2000, the American Bar Association became a supporter of the organization, creating a policy requesting lawyers to become involved in the program by stressing the importance of engaging and educating students about the United States legal process. About this issue, Sandra Day O'Connor and Roy Romer said in 2006:

Most young people today simply do not have an adequate understanding of how our government and political system work, and they are thus not well prepared to participate as citizens.

As of 2025, the program operates in 50 states and the District of Columbia, serving 47,000 high school students around the country. (Note: The 12 states without a youth government program include: Alaska, Arkansas, Iowa, Nebraska, Nevada, North Dakota, Rhode Island, South Dakota, Utah, Vermont, West Virginia and Wyoming.)

== Overview ==
The organization's mission is to "help create the next generation of thoughtful, committed and active citizens" by teaching them the "principles of a democratic society." They also intend to create leaders through their roles in the models of local, state and national government. The premise is that "leaders are developed by doing."

The model government programs include the judicial, legislative and executive branches of government, including press corps in certain states, which are guided by teachers, volunteers or Youth Government staff. Volunteers may include attorneys from the American Bar Association, legislators, business people and other organizations, such as the Alabama Civil Justice Foundation.

The Washington D.C. model follows the order of committee to city council then being signed by the elected Youth Mayor of the regional program to be passed on to the Mayor of D.C.

=== Branches of government ===
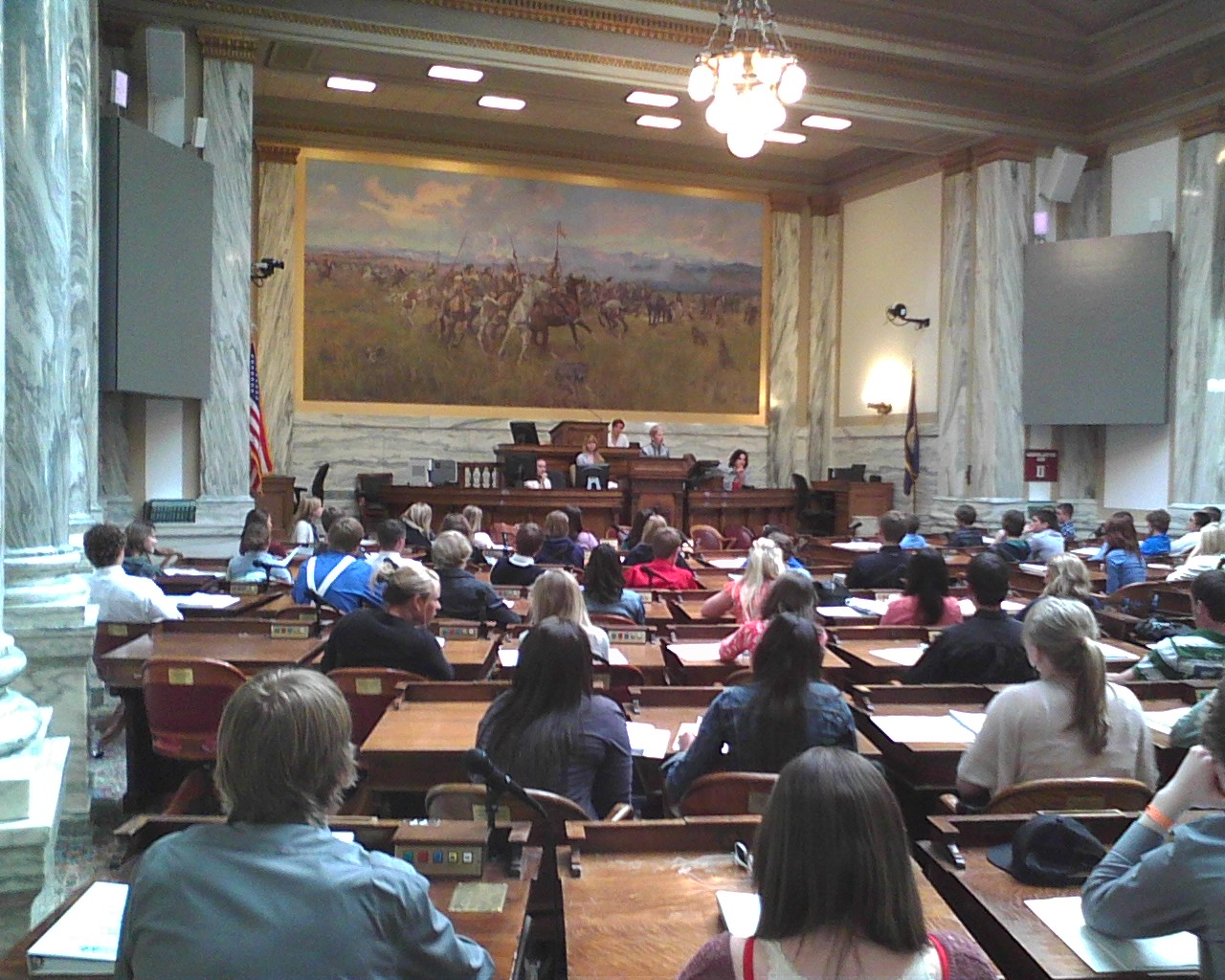
Montana Youth Legislature meeting in the Montana House of Representatives chambers

Legislative

The participants of the Model Legislative Assemblies are elected into or assume the roles of senators, governors, representatives, lawyers, lobbyists and the press. Bills are drafted, discussed in committee, and debated. Much of this work is conducted locally prior the model legislature, which often occurs at the state capitol in House and Senate chambers. At the state level, bills are brought before the House and Senate floors to be debated. A vote is taken to determine if it passes or not. Bills that pass the legislative process are presented to current governmental officials; In some cases bills that pass the Youth Government legislative process have been enacted into state law. (Note: As an example of the program at work in California, in 2006 students first attended a training camp. Then, in the wake of Hurricane Katrina, students participating in the Youth & Government program spent 6 months drafting, debating and crafting a bill to add emergency preparedness training to school's health curricula to the State Education Code. The exercise included students taking the role of assembly members, senators, and lobbyists. The program: "Not only does the youth and government program teach students about the workings of government, it gives them an opportunity to interact with various political leaders and gives them an chance to meet students from other parts of the state.)

The programs are generally for high school students, but some states also have collegiate models. Middle school students may be pages. Certain states have a program specifically tailored for middle schoolers who want to learn how the United States government functions, and wish to continue onto the high school program. This section is similar to Youth & Government, but on a smaller scale, and is called Junior Youth & Government.

Judicial

Students specific to their role—such as attorney, witness, or judge—and try a case or present a case to an appellate court. Students who are Freshman or Sophomores normally prepare a case for the Court of Appeals. Students who are Juniors and Seniors normally prepare a case for the Supreme Court. All students also get to prepare a case for the Trial Court. Students normally get a chance to argue each side of their case throughout the weekend. Throughout the weekend each student also receives a chance to judge an Appeals Court or a Supreme Court case, there are normally five to seven judges during each of these trials. Students are able to judge as many cases as they would like throughout the weekend.

Executive

Executive branch positions may vary by state but are primarily mirrors of that state's elected offices. For example, in Maine, the positions include governor, and governor's cabinet, including: the Attorney General, the State Treasurer, the Commissioner of Economic Development, the Commissioner of Education, the Commissioner of Human Services, and the Commissioner of Natural Resources.

=== Other programs ===
Model United Nations programs

Many states have a Model United Nations program. For instance, the Northeast Region (NJ, DE, MD, and PA) have a joint Model UN Program that serves more than 2,000 students annually, one of the largest Model UN Programs in the country. Their program has four central values: (1) helping students find their voices, (2) promoting global understanding, (3) creating a sense of community and exchange of ideas, and (4) serving others through projects that reinforce topics (e.g., in 2016, students work with Develop Africa, a non-profit, to provide more than 17,000 pencils to students in Africa).

Additionally, the state of California's MUN program brings together over 1,000 middle school students from the state to represent countries from around the world and debate issues of international importance. Their program consists of: the United Nations General Assembly, the International Court of Justice, ECOSOC or the United Nations Economic and Social Council, the United Nations Security Council, the Office of the Secretary-General, the International Press Corps/Department of Global Communications, and United Nations Secretariat. Each Organ elects its leadership for the year, and the conference as whole elects its Secretary General for the following year.

National conferences

Each state may participate in the national programs. Delegates are selected to attend the Conference on National Affairs or the National Judicial Competition. The elected governors from each state attend the Youth Governor's Conference.

The National YMCA holds the Youth Conference on National Affairs (CONA) at the Blue Ridge Assembly in North Carolina, the YMCA Changemakers Summit, YMCA Youth Advocate Program, and the Youth Governors Conference (Note: The Youth Governor's Conference, established in 1949, serves as a weeklong national servant leadership training session for all students elected to serve as Governor (or in some cases Chief Justice, Lieutenant Governor, or Secretary-General) of their state programs.) in Washington, D.C., and the National Judicial Competition (NJC) at the Minnesota State Capitol in St. Paul.

State Affairs

The State Affairs Forum, or SAF as it is commonly known, is another program in Youth and Government. Students have the opportunity to come up with a solution to an issue their state is facing, i.e. security, campus carry, etc. Students may work in groups up to 3 and present their 'proposal for action' in front of their committee room. The committee room is monitored by a chair and clerk team,

== State programs ==
This section is a summary of state program participation. The legislative, judiciary and executive programs are generally available to high school students only. If a state has a model program for middle school students it is either the Model Legislative Assembly or Model United Nations.

Some states have Model United Nations programs for high school students and/or programs for college students.

Summary chart of program participation, by state
State	Capital	Program	Model Legislature	Model Judiciary	Model Executive	Model United Nations	Middle school	College program
Alabama	Montgomery	Yes	Yes	Yes	Yes			Model Legislature
Alaska	Juneau	No						
Arizona	Phoenix	Yes	Yes		*			
Arkansas	Little Rock	No						
California	Sacramento	Yes	Yes	Yes	Yes	Middle school	Model United Nations	Model Legislature, Court Intern Program
Colorado	Denver	Yes	Yes	Yes	Yes			
Connecticut	Hartford	Yes	Yes	Yes	Yes			
Delaware	Dover	Yes	Yes	Yes	Yes		Model Legislature	
Florida	Tallahassee	Yes	Yes	Yes	Yes		Model Legislature	
Georgia	Atlanta	Yes	Yes	Yes	Yes	High school, middle school	Model Legislature, Model United Nations	
Hawaii	Honolulu	Yes	Yes		*		Model Legislature	
Idaho	Boise	Yes	Yes	Yes	*			
Illinois	Springfield	Yes	Yes	Yes	*			
Indiana	Indianapolis	Yes	Yes	Yes	Yes			
Iowa	Des Moines	No						
Kansas	Topeka	Yes	Yes		*			
Kentucky	Frankfort	Yes	Yes		*	Yes	Model Legislature, Model United Nations	
Louisiana	Baton Rouge	Yes	Yes	Yes	Yes	High School		
Maine	Augusta	Yes	Yes		*			
Maryland	Annapolis	Yes	Yes		*			
Massachusetts	Boston	Yes	Yes	Yes	Yes			
Michigan	Lansing	Yes	Yes	Yes	Yes		Model Legislature	
Minnesota	St. Paul	Yes	Yes	Yes	Yes	Yes		
Mississippi	Jackson	Yes	Yes		*	Middle school, High school	Model Legislature, Model United Nations	
Missouri	Jefferson City	Yes	Yes	Yes	Yes			
Montana	Helena	Yes	Yes	Yes	Yes			
Nebraska	Lincoln	No						
Nevada	Carson City	No						
New Hampshire	Concord	Yes	Yes		*			
New Jersey	Trenton	Yes	Yes	Yes	Yes	Yes	Yes	
New Mexico	Santa Fe	Yes	Yes	Yes	*	Yes		
New York	Albany, New York	Yes	Yes	Yes	Yes			
North Carolina	Raleigh	Yes	Yes	Yes	*			
North Dakota	Bismarck	No						
Ohio	Columbus	Yes	Yes	Yes	*			
Oklahoma	Oklahoma City	Yes	Yes	Yes	Yes	Yes	Model Legislature, Model United Nations	
Oregon	Salem	Yes	Yes		*			
Pennsylvania	Harrisburg	Yes	Yes	Yes	*		Model Legislature	
Rhode Island	Providence	No						
South Carolina	Columbia	Yes	Yes	Yes	Yes	Middle school	Model Legislature, Model United Nations	
South Dakota	Pierre	No						
Tennessee	Nashville	Yes	Yes	Yes	Yes	Yes, with Int'l Criminal Court	Model Legislature and/or Model United Nations	
Texas	Austin	Yes	Yes		*			
Utah	Salt Lake City	No						
Vermont	Montpelier	No						
Virginia	Richmond	Yes	Yes		*			
Washington	Olympia	Yes	Yes	Yes	Yes		Model Legislature (8th grade only)	College Ambassador Program
West Virginia	Charleston	Yes	Yes	Yes	Yes	Yes		
Wisconsin	Madison	Yes	Yes		*			
Wyoming	Cheyenne	No						
Washington D.C.	N/A	Yes	Yes		*			
* Executive programs may not be expressly stipulated in the Youth and Government program material, but the Governor is required to enact the laws into legislation. Generally, there are other executive officials that are engaged in the project.

=== Alabama ===
The Alabama YMCA Youth in Government program, in operation since 1949, has simulated the five branches of government.

The programs include a Youth Model Assembly of the state legislature, conducted strictly to the state's processes in the State Capitol building, and beginning in 1996 a Collegiate Model Assembly. Each year, 500-600 youth participate in the program. Since 1998, an Alabama Youth Summit is conducted at the University of Alabama with participants from Youth in Government, Alabama Boys State and Alabama Girls State to propose, draft, debate, draft and present proposed legislation the governor's office." A judicial mock trial competition is held annually in November.

The only state to do so, the Alabama Youth Legislature holds an electoral college in which delegates elect candidates for major offices.

Since its inception, the program has served tens of thousands of youth, some of whom received support and mentoring from legislators, business people and the Alabama Civil Justice Foundation.

=== Arizona ===
The Arizona state Youth and Government program conducts model legislative procedures at the State Capitol building. The sessions are conducted in the fall for high school students. (Note: The YMCA of Southern Arizona conducts a Youth and Government local program and participates at the state level. Its goal in working with the youth of Tucson is to "promote the development of civic responsibilities, attitudes, skills and behaviors.")

=== California ===
The California YMCA Youth & Government (Y&G) organization has sponsored statewide educational programs for more than 70,000 junior high and high school students since 1948. Its mission is to "build values-based leadership and civic engagement in California's youth to strengthen our democracy."

The state's high school student programs include the Model Legislature and Court (with over 3500 participants), National Judicial Competition, Conference of National Affairs, and the Sacramento Conference held in February. Students either attend sessions in the State Capitol, convention center, or the Court of Appeals. Middle school students (grades 6–8) may participate in the state's Model United Nations program. The Model Legislature & Court Intern Program is for college students. Individuals more than 21 years of age may participate in the program as a volunteer staff member or advisor. The organization also has an alumni association.

California YMCA Youth & Government operates as an independently chartered YMCA. In 2012 Governor Edmund G. Brown Jr. signed bill AB 233 into law which allows for voluntary contributions on the personal income tax for the California YMCA Youth and Government Fund.

=== Colorado ===
The Colorado YMCA Youth in Government had its first session in 1948. Each year, there is a General Assembly for high school students in the Colorado State Capitol in Denver that takes place over three days in November. Participants generally attend general training sessions prior to the General Assembly for their roles as legislators, lawyers, journalists or candidates. The program consists of a model bicameral legislature, a Supreme Court, and the press. Its programs cover each of the three branches of government. Individuals over the age of 21 may participate as advisors.

=== Connecticut ===
The Connecticut YMCA Youth and Government Program has been in operation since 1944. It introduces high school students to the operation of the Connecticut General Assembly via participation in a mock legislative session. The annual state conference is held at the State Capitol, which follows months of preparation developing and crafting bills. (Note: The Connecticut program includes writing, debating and presenting a bill at the state conference. Lobbyists write position papers and journals write newspaper articles. Leadership positions include chairing a committee, presiding over House or Senate debate, advising the Youth Governor. Delegates can create political parties or run for a position, such as Attorney General or Governor.) Another program is the Youth in Law program for exploration of the judicial branch of government. (Note: The Connecticut Youth has participants study a court case and prepare legal arguments for presentation in an appellate court setting.)

=== Delaware ===
The Delaware YMCA Youth In Government Program was founded in 1969.

Their programs include the 3 day Model Legislative Conference, (Note: After preparation, debating and writing bills, participants attend a 3-day model legislature session at Dover's Legislative Hall. Positions include Presiding Officers, Representatives, Senators, governor, lobbyists, press or page corps.) participation in the Model Judicial Competition. Leading up to the Model Legislative Conference in April are Weekly Delegation Meetings, beginning in the month of January. There is also a one-day Pre-Legislative training and Elections Conference held in late February or early March at Legislative Hall in Dover, DE.

The bills passed by during the Legislative Conference are presented to state legislators for consideration. Some of the youth government bills have been passed into law in Delaware.

Additionally, students from Delaware attend the Northeast Regional YMCA Model UN Program (NJ, PA, DE, and MD), which hosts more than 2,000 students annually (mun1.ymcace.org).

=== Florida ===
The Florida YMCA Youth In Government program, founded in 1957, includes a Senior Youth In Government program (YIG) for high school students and a Junior Youth In Government program (JYIG) for middle school students. Their program examines the legislative, judicial and executive branches of government, including simulation of media and lobbyist interactions. The Junior program is a mock legislature.

=== Georgia ===
The State YMCA of Georgia opened in 1919 with a sole focus of youth development in Hi-Y Clubs. The first Hi-Y Club was at Fort Valley High School (now Peach County High School). In 1929, the organization was officially registered as a Georgia nonprofit corporation. In that same year, the organization introduced Tri-Hi-Y programs-the first being at Douglas High School in southeast Georgia. The Georgia Youth In Government Program, which started in 1946, consists of a Youth Assembly (YA) and Senior Georgia United National Assembly (GUNA) for high school students and Junior Youth Assembly (JYA) and Junior GUNA for middle school students. Their program examines the legislative, judicial and executive branches of government, including simulation of media and lobbyist interactions. The Junior program is a mock legislature. At the close of 2020, the State YMCA of Georgia became an independent organization separate from the National YMCA. The new organization is the Georgia Center for Civic Engagement, www.georgiacivics.org. Their Youth In Government programs such as Youth Assembly and Model United Nations for both middle and high school students remain intact.

=== Hawaii ===
The Hawaii Youth In Government program conducts a Model Assembly, called the YMCA Hawaii State Youth Legislature for middle and high school students. Training and legislative bill creation occurs prior to a week-long session at the State Capitol.

=== Idaho ===
The Idaho YMCA Youth Government program conducts a Model Assembly Program and Judicial Branch Program, which is open to high school students. Students may participate through local program or regional convention, where bill creation, judicial research and competition and campaigning for the state session at the State Capitol. Students who attend the regional convention may be elected to attend the state convention for the legislative session or state Supreme Court sessions.

=== Illinois ===
Illinois YMCA's Youth and Government program, founded by YMCA executive director Douglas Monahan in 1949, simulates legislation and judicial processes for high school students (freshman to seniors). Preliminary sessions occur in the fall where participants write bills or learn about and engage in judicial processes. In the spring, a 3-day conference is held at the State Capitol in Senate and House Chambers for the legislative assembly and a courtroom in the state Supreme Court building for the judicial branch.

Bills passed through the youth government legislative process are submitted to for review by the House and Senate.

=== Indiana ===
In 1994, Indiana YMCA Youth and Government (INYaG) was reinvigorated after a fifteen-year hiatus and continued under the leadership of the YMCA of Greater Indianapolis in 2001. In 2013, Indiana's YMCAs transitioned the program to the Indiana State Alliance of YMCAs in order to capitalize on the Alliance's statewide focus and its work in state-level policy formation. Throughout its transitions, INYaG has retained its mission to develop personal growth and encourage lifelong, responsible citizenship by providing experiential learning for young people and providing public forums to recognize the abilities and capabilities of youth. INYaG programs have sought to develop and promote an understanding of local, state, national, and international concerns; research, study and debate on public issues; exploration of careers in public service; interaction with adult and youth leaders involved in decision-making processes; an understanding of political systems and the forum they provide for the effective and peaceful resolution of issues and concerns; appreciation for the diversity of viewpoints on public issues and a concurrent respect for ideas, beliefs and the positions of others; and demonstration of citizenship responsibilities and leadership roles essential to the health of participatory democracy.

INYaG is a statewide hands-on program for students in grade 7 though 12. It consists of a Youth General Assembly, Executive Program, Judicial Program, and Media Program. Seventh graders and first-time eighth graders can participate in the Middle School Program. Through INYaG, Hoosier youth spend part of each year meeting in local delegations to discuss and debate issues that affect Indiana citizens, propose relevant legislation, write and debate bills, prepare for judicial proceedings, and campaign for governmental offices. Local activities culminate in an annual statewide model-government program.

INYaG also sends delegates who participated in the Model Government Conference to the YMCA Conference on National Affairs and the YMCA National Judicial Competition each summer.

=== Kansas ===
Kansas YMCA Youth in Government conducts a Youth Legislature program for high school students. Participants attend sessions locally to create bills before attending a state conference in Topeka where they are argued in the Kansas State Capitol chambers.

=== Kentucky ===
Kentucky's Youth In Government is the largest model government program for youth in the country, with more than 8,000 participants attending annual conferences. Its activities include:

- University of Louisville College Youth in Government (YIG)
- Western Kentucky University College Youth in Government (YIG)
- Kentucky Youth Assembly (KYA) for high school, and middle school students
- Kentucky United Nations Assembly (KUNA) for high school, and middle school students.
- Y-Corps service learning program
- Leadership Training Conference
- "Go-For-It!" conference.
- National Judicial Competition

=== Louisiana ===
The YMCA Louisiana Youth & Government program supports more than 60 high school clubs and two conferences annually: Model United Nations and Youth Legislature. The conference provides student participants with the experience of being a part of a functioning state government, from bill passage to policy advising. Participants are assigned to one of the following programs: Lt. Governor's Cabinet, Senate, House of Representatives, Supreme Court or Press. Positions of aides, couriers, and liaisons are also available for student participation in this three-day program. The conference is in its 63rd year and was one of the original states to send a delegation to the Conference on National Affairs.

=== Maine ===
The Maine Youth In Government program conducts a Model Assembly program in two phases: a regional training session and the Augusta State House Session, where they have use of the actual chambers of the House and Senate, and Capital facilities. At the regional training session: bills are submitted, officers are elected and delegates determine which session they will attend. During the visit to the capital, participants debate the locally created bills.

The Youth Governor attends the National Youth Governor's Conference.

=== Maryland ===
In 1945 the Maryland YMCA Youth & Government high school program had its first session. It conducts a Model Assembly program. After a statewide training sessions where they learn about the parliamentary process, students form delegations, research and debate issues, write bills and campaign among their peers. The culminating statewide event is a three-day mock assembly in Annapolis, where Delegates meet for a three-day legislative session in the State Capitol. Delegates use the Maryland State House and committee rooms to debate their bills.

Additionally, students from Maryland attend the Northeast Regional YMCA Model UN Program (NJ, PA, DE, and MD), which hosts more than 2,000 students annually (mun1.ymcace.org).

=== Massachusetts ===
The Massachusetts Youth and Government program consists of a legislative assembly program with legislative, judicial, lobbyists and the media functions. Sessions are conducted in advance of the annual statewide event to create bills, write press articles, do mock trial preparations and perform other tasks needed to prepare for the conference in March. The annual state conference is held at the Massachusetts State House in Boston, Massachusetts. For those three days, students are able to take part in debate as well as develop essential leadership skills. A delegate in the legislative branch drafts and presents a bill each year in hopes of passing it through the house or senate chambers, and into law. At the annual spring conference, the executive branch positions for Governor, Attorney General and Lieutenant Governor are announced and applicants for the Conference on National Affairs and National Judicial Competition are chosen.

=== Michigan ===
The Michigan YMCA Youth in Government (MYIG) had its first session in 1949. On average, 1,200 students attend the conference. Every year, there are two high school conferences, and two middle school conferences. The conferences are held at the Michigan State Capitol in Lansing, with the middle school conference taking place in November and the High school conferences taking place in February and March. Each conference consists of a model bicameral legislature, the Model Judiciary Program (MJP), the National Issues Forum (NIF), a Governor's Cabinet, a lobbyist program and the Press Corps. Officer positions include Governor, Lieutenant Governor, Speaker of the House, Head Lobbyist, NIF Presiding Officer, Secretary of State and Editor-in-Chief. Michigan was a charter delegation at the National Judiciary Conference, which was partially founded by former MYIG Executive Director Brent Veysey. The NIF program at MYIG is set up with the same structure as the YMCA Conference on National Affairs.

=== Minnesota ===
The Minnesota Youth In Government program consists of both a Model Assembly, representing the state legislative system, and a Model United Nations. Training sessions for delegates as well as elected and appointed officials are held throughout the year. The Model Assembly is run each January at the Minnesota State Capitol building in Saint Paul with over 2000 students in attendance.

It consists of the legislative, judicial and executive branches. The legislative branch includes the drafting, debating and voting on bills and has the largest percentage of participants. There are three sets of houses and senates, two of which are exclusively underclassmen in high school and a referred to as lower legislatures well one is exclusive to upper classmen is a referred to as upper legislature. The program has three judicial systems – a Trial Court, an Appeals Court, and a mock Supreme Court. The executive branch includes the Youth Governor, who vetoes and signs legislation from the upper legislatures, and Lt. Governor manages legislation from the lower legislatures.

=== Mississippi ===
The Mississippi Youth & Government program annually serves middle and high school students with leadership development opportunities. Approximately 1000 students participate in its programs, which include:

- The Youth Legislature Conference for senior high school students who craft and debate bills locally in preparation for a three-day legislative conference in Jackson, Mississippi.
- The Junior Youth Assembly Conference (JYA) for middle school students.
- The Model United Nations Conference (MUN) for middle school and high school students
- Summer Leadership Experience, a conference for senior high school students.

One of the alumni of the program is Greg Davis, Southaven mayor.

=== Missouri ===
The Missouri Youth in Government (MOYIG) program brings over 700 Missouri youth to Jefferson City, Missouri, each year. There are two conventions: one in late November and the other in early December. MOYIG consists of legislative, judicial, media, and executive branches, and students are able to hold offices required to support the simulated government, such as legislators, governor, judges, journalists and more.

Missouri's Youth in Government holds a program called the Executive Branch Leadership Institute (EBLI) every spring, in which 30-40 students travel to Jefferson City to shadow a state department for two days. At the department they are presented with an issue or problem in Missouri and, on the last day of the program, present their opinions and creative solutions to a panel of judges. Scholarship awards are given at EBLI for the best teams and the best individual presenters.

=== Montana ===
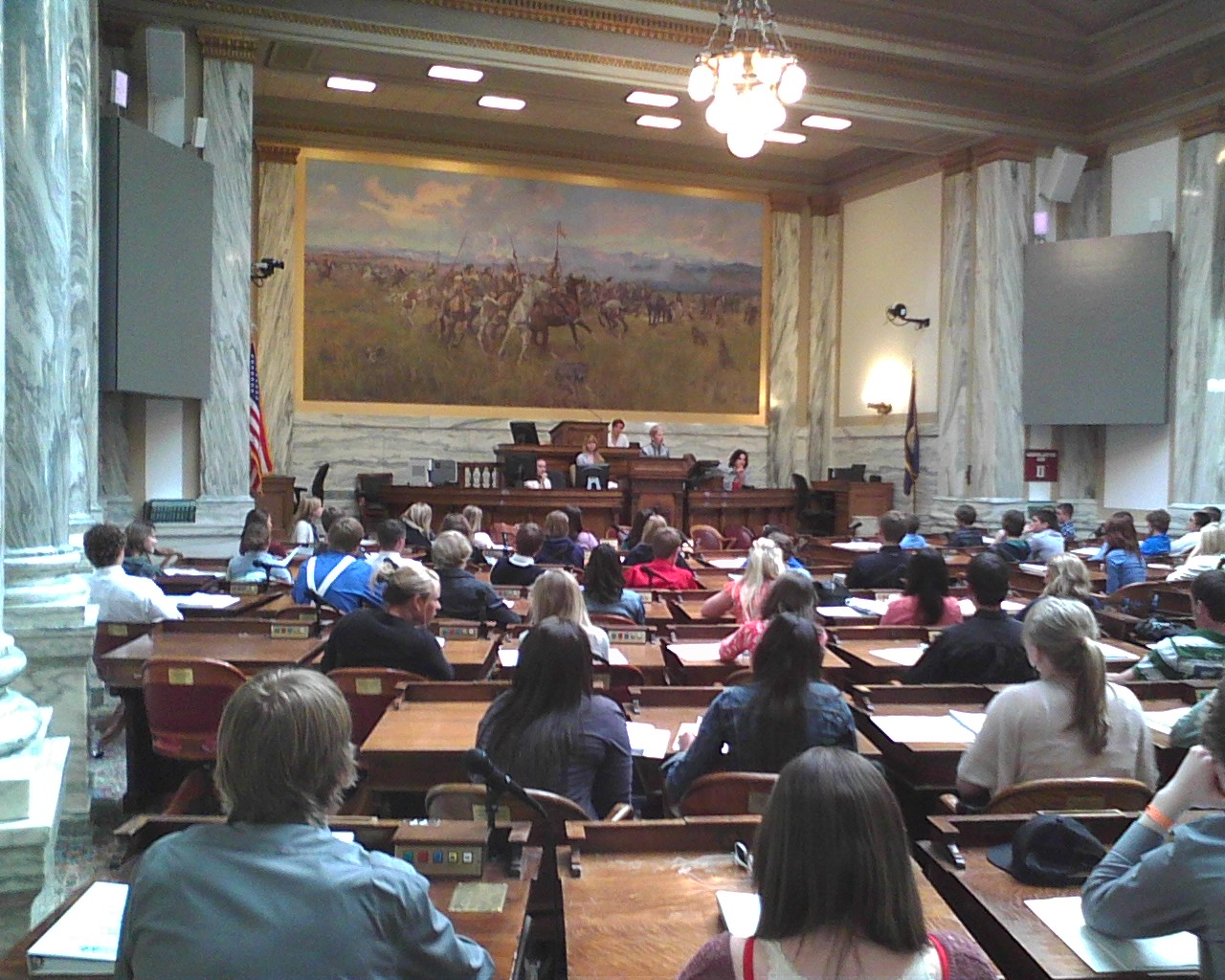
Montana program in House of Representatives

Montana's program was organized in 1970, with the first Youth Legislature held in the spring of 1971. The following year it held a youth "Con-Con", corresponding with the state's 1972 Montana Constitutional Convention. The program serves over 300 young people. Former Montana Governor Steve Bullock was Youth Governor of this program as a high school student.

=== New Hampshire ===
The New Hampshire program is the YMCA Youth and Government. Every spring, it occurs in the New Hampshire State House. Prior to each year's session, there is a pre-legislative session to elect officers, including Youth Governor, Speaker of the House, and President of the Senate. Students write bills, engage in debate in committees and in full meetings of their chamber. There is also a Supreme Court program that occurs in the New Hampshire Supreme Court building.

=== New Jersey ===
New Jersey Youth and Government (NJ YAG) is a student debate and educational program modeled after New Jersey's legislative process. The program has 500 members from 26 schools. Every spring, Youth and Government holds its 3-day conference in the New Jersey Statehouse. Delegates write their own bills, which proceed from committees to a bicameral legislature through sessions of debate. Bills successful enough to pass through both houses have the chance to reach the Governor's desk and Cabinet. An election is held each year for the following year's Youth Governor of the program, who will be the figurehead of the conference and leader of the officer corps.

Each year, a conference wide service project is conducted. In the past this has been limited to a collection of items at conference, but in 2013, student leaders brought the vision of expanding the delegate experience outside of conference to life. On April 5 and 6, 2013, ninety-four NJ Youth and Government delegates volunteered in seven different charities across the state. The charities included the Community Food Bank of New Jersey, Elijah's Promise, Trinity Church, Franklin Township Food Bank, Rise Community Center, Jon Bon Jovi Soul Kitchen, and Fisherman's Mark. Volunteer activities ranged from pantry organization to cooking food to garden cleaning. Though not every school out of the 26 that came to conference were able to participate in the Day of Service, the program was able to further empower their delegates in Palmyra to plan their own Day of Service, which on April 20 at the Epworth United Methodist Church in Palmyra, showing that there is always the opportunity to give back.

Additionally, the Northeast Regional Model United Nations Program is hosted by New Jersey through cooperation with Delaware, Pennsylvania, and Maryland. More than 2,000 students from Middle School and High School attend this annual conference, engaging in committee simulations on a host of international topics.

=== New Mexico ===
The New Mexico program is known as YMCA Youth and Government and was founded in 1960. The program currently host 2 model government conferences, one for middle school students (grades 6–8) in November and one for high school students (grades 9–12) in April. Both of these conferences are held at the New Mexico State Capitol building in Santa Fe.

New Mexico YAG has 6 Branches, Legislative, Judicial, Executive, Lobbying, Media and Task Force, and holds elections for 9 statewide officer positions consistent with real life New Mexico Statewide official's elections. Those positions are Governor, Lt. Governor, Speaker of the House, Chief Justice, Secretary of State, Attorney General, State Auditor, State Treasurer, and Land Commissioner.

=== New York ===
New York is proud to serve as the birthplace of YMCA Youth and Government, where the program was established in 1936 by Clement A. Duran. The program now offers both middle school (grades 6–8) and high school (grades 9–12) model state government assemblies to students and schools across the state. There are fifteen Presiding Officer positions including; Governor, Lieutenant Governor, Chief Justice, Comptroller, Attorney General, Public Defender, President Pro Tempore (x2), Speaker of the Assembly (x2), Deputy President Pro Tempore (x2), Deputy Speaker of the Assembly (x2), and Editor-in-Chief. The Lieutenant Governor serves as the head of the Senate Chambers with the President Pro Tempore as their deputy. The New York State Youth and Government program includes an executive branch with a governor, lieutenant governor,comptroller, and a cabinet.

The legislative branch, now with four concurrent assemblies, includes Assembly Freedom, Assembly Liberty, Senate Freedom, and Senate Liberty. Legislative sessions occur in the New York Assembly Chamber in the Capitol, the Assembly Parlor Room, and a hearing room in the Legislative Office Building. The Speakers and their deputies serve as the presiding officers for the assemblies, and the President Pro Tempores and their deputies serve as the presiding officers for the senates.

The judicial branch consists of a chief justice, public defender, attorney general, associate justices, and attorneys. The Press Corp is also a part of the team, with the Editor-in-Chief serving as their presiding officer.

=== North Carolina ===
North Carolina has hosted an annual four-day Youth Legislator Assembly every February in downtown Raleigh since 1993. The conference includes Legislative, Judicial, Lobbyist, and Press programs. One notable achievement from North Carolina's Youth and Government was winning the 2019 National Judicial Competition in the Court of Appeals category. Attorneys Brooks Meine and Evan Zhang won representing North Carolina, and Meine won an "Outstanding Attorney Award". About 1500 students attended the 2010 conference, which is held in February. The Conference was online from 2021 to 2022, but returned to the Raleigh Convention center for the 2023 conference.

=== Ohio ===
Ohio's YMCA Youth & Government program began in 1952 to reflect that “democracy must be learned by each generation” The Ohio YMCA Youth & Government program has high school and middle school students act as state legislators, governors, lobbyists, lawyers, and committee chairs. The students simulate all phases and positions of the state government and are challenged with issues real legislators face in their elected offices.

The Ohio YMCA Youth & Government program was led by Ohio-West Virginia Area YMCA from 1952 until 1970 when the Ohio-West Virginia Area Council ceased to operate program in the 1970s as the Ohio-West Virginia Area YMCA and the State YMCA of Michigan became the Great Lakes Region YMCA. In 1972 the Great Lakes Region YMCA appointed an Executive of what was called the West Virginia-Ohio YMCA, operated by the Great Lakes Region to run the YMCA Youth & Government and HI-Y programs throughout the states of West Virginia and Ohio. The Great Lakes Region continued to support these programs into the 1980s. In 1984 a new Ohio-West Virginia YMCA is chartered by the National YMCA. At the end of 2012 the Ohio-West Virginia YMCA made the decision to no longer be a YMCA and chose to return their charter to Y-USA, at this time the Ohio Alliance of YMCA's began operating the Ohio YMCA Youth & Government programs.

In 2015, under the leadership of director Charlie Myers, Ohio YMCA Youth & Government held its first middle school conference. The next year, the decision was made to split the high school program into two conferences due to an explosion in membership from 2013 to 2016. In 2016 Ohio adopted the YMCA Youth and Government name, to follow the YMCA of the USA adopted name.

Currently the Ohio YMCA Youth & Government program is serving nearly 500 students a year.

=== Oklahoma ===
As of 2015, the Oklahoma Youth and Government program consists of a video and print News Media, a Judicial Section containing both a mock trial and appellate court, and a three-house Legislature. Each year, the Oklahoma program has two district delegate training sessions (typically in September/October) and two District Conferences (typically in November/December). The State Conference is a three-day event that begins on Thursday night with a dinner, a keynote speaker, and a question and answer session with the two Governor Candidates. On Friday, the Conference continues with a full day at the Oklahoma State Capitol followed by an evening of fellowship activities, and ending on Saturday with a half day at the Capitol consisting of elections, bill signings, a Judicial showcase and closing banquet. The Saturday night banquet includes an awards ceremony, Youth Governor and other elected official's elections, as well as the announcement of delegates who have been chosen to go to the Conference on National Affairs. Approximately one month after the state conference, the middle school legislature convenes for Model Legislative Day at the State Capitol. The conference is led by the high-school officers and follows traditional legislative procedures.

=== Oregon ===
Oregon YMCA Youth and Government model legislature at the State Capitol building. The program provides students with the opportunity to simulate and learn government processes and problem solve for issues affecting the state.

=== Pennsylvania ===
The Pennsylvania Youth and Government program was founded in 1946 by Lieutenant Governor Daniel B. Strickler. (Note: Pennsylvania's David B. Strickler Service to Youth award was named to honor the late Lieutenant Governor, Lancaster YMCA president, and founder of the states Youth and Government program.) It simulates the legislative and judicial branches of government. The Commonwealth is divided into Eastern and Western sections, which both hold individual Elections Conventions and Pre-Legislative Sessions before combining into a single group for Model Legislation in April in the Commonwealth's Capital Building in Harrisburg, Pennsylvania.

The largest branch is the Legislature, with both a House of Representatives and a Senate. During the process of creating and finalizing bills students learn about Parliamentary Procedure, which is modeled after Robert's Rules. The Judicial Branch conducts appellant-level trial proceedings in the Supreme Court Chambers. The elected Governor and cabinet officials of the Administrative Branch are responsible for running the conventions, lobbying for or against bills, and holding press conferences. The Press Corps consists of a newspaper and media staff.

Middle-school students and high school students alike participate in the three branches (Legislative, Judicial, and Press Corps). Delegates ranging from fifth through eighth grade have the option to serve as pages, assisting chairs and P.Os.

=== South Carolina ===
South Carolina's Youth in Government program began in 1988 and has grown to include over 1,200 high school participants.

- High School Mock Legislature - The annual 4-day conference is held during the third week of November on the state's capitol grounds in Columbia. The conference includes legislative, judicial, and executive branches and press programs.
- Horizons Values Conference is held every May.
- Leadership Conference at Pawleys Island takes place every September.
- Middle School Mock Legislature has about 300 participants.
- Middle School Model United Nations conference every April, and is unique because it is staffed by high school Youth in Government participants.

As of 2012, South Carolina sends attorney teams to the summer National Judicial Program in Chicago.

=== Tennessee ===
Tennessee's Youth in Government program is the second largest in the nation, with approximately 6000 students participating in Youth In Government and Model United Nations conferences. The program is conducted by the YMCA Center for Civic Engagement, headquartered in Nashville. Youth in Government is an annual conference held for high school and middle school students in the Tennessee State Capitol to simulate the legislative, executive, and judicial branches. Students serve as Senators or Representatives in the General Assembly, justices or lawyers in the Supreme Court, the Governor and their cabinet (including the Commissioners of all the State Executive Branches), members of the conference press corps, or lobbyists for a firm. Each fall, a Model United Nations conference is sponsored, where students participate as either a member country or presiding officer of the General Assembly, a member country of the Security Council, a member of the Secretariat under the elected Secretary-General, a lawyer or justice in the International Court of Justice, or a member of the conference press corps. Both programs are for high school students (9–12) and also offer abbreviated versions to middle school students across the state. The CCE has an expansive alumni program, with graduates of the program serving as conference staff, delegation leaders, or component advisors.

=== Texas ===
Texas has both a Youth and Government program serving grades 9 through 12 as well as Junior Youth and Government program for grades 6–8. They have several different programs including Legislative, Judicial (Trial Court, Appellate Court, and County Court) State Affairs, Media (Print, Broadcast, Social Media, and Photojournalism), Lobbyists, and Governor's Cabinet. There are five district conferences in the fall (Austin, Dallas, Fort Worth, Houston, and Midland) before the state conferences take place in the winter. Traditionally the high school conference is at the end of January and the junior high conference is in February. Both state conferences take place in Austin with many sections utilizing the Capitol building and other state government offices.

=== Virginia ===
The Virginia YMCA was a statewide educational organization promoting leadership and civic engagement for teenagers in the Commonwealth. Since their founding in 1884, students participated in programs such as the Model General Assembly, Model Judicial Program, Hi-Y/Tri-Hi-Y/Youth & Government Clubs, and the Williamsburg program. These programs provided opportunities for students to have a hands-on opportunity to see firsthand the inner workings of the state government. Their programs also provided opportunities in community leadership, media literacy, educational voting, and civic activism. There are several notable alum of the Virginia YMCA's Youth and Government programs, such as Governor Ralph Northam, Senator Monty Mason, Senator Jill Vogel, Senator Louis Lewis, Delegate Rob Bloxom, Delegate Todd Gilbert, Chief Justice Lemons, Judge Gordon Vincent, and more. On December 31, 2024, the Virginia YMCA terminated its Charter with YMCA-USA and rebranded as an independent nonprofit, retaining the same programming detailed above. Now, the Virginia Youth Civics and Leadership Association (VaYCLA) continues the work its original founders began in 1871.

=== Washington ===
Washington's Youth and Government program has served the state's politically active youth since 1947. Washington's program currently serves over 1,500 student participants annually. Washington Youth and Government, also known as WAYAG, sponsors the Youth Legislature and mock trial, programs.

In Mock Trial, the district winning judicial teams compete for the State Championship in Olympia in March. The State Champion team advances to and competes in the annual National competition.

The Youth Legislature is divided into six districts and normally convenes as a state in Olympia for four days in May. Each district hosts events to elect and nominate student leaders to serve and/or campaign at the state level. State session opens annually on the first Wednesday in May on the Capitol Campus in Olympia. The first day of session commences with committee meetings, and concludes with an opening joint session of the legislature during which the Governor and other prominent figures address advisors, participants, and spectators. The next three days are filled with debate in the House and Senate chambers, as well as campaigning for Major Office positions, voting for said positions, and other proceedings of the program departments. Washington State's session concludes with a closing joint session during which the Governor address the program, and the new Major Officers are announced. The Governor also hosts a ball in the state's rotunda on Friday night.

Washington State Youth and Government hosts House and Senate chambers for 10th-12th graders, the O'Brien House and Cherberg Senate chambers for 9th graders and 8th graders who are not participating in the 8th grade chambers, three debate chambers for 8th graders, a page corps, a press corps, a lobbyist corps, and the offices of the Governor, Attorney General, Secretary of State, and Director of Elections. All sectors take place in the actual State Capitol facilities. Washington State's Major Office positions include Governor, Lieutenant Governor, Speaker of the House, and 8 other important student-held positions.

Washington Youth and Government has sent representatives to the Conference on National Affairs (CONA) every year since 2009, and has been home to one Presiding Officer.

=== Washington, D.C. ===
The Washington, D.C. has a YMCA Youth & Government program. Each year they hold conferences inside the DC City Council Chamber.

=== Wisconsin ===
The first Wisconsin YMCA Model Government was held in the Capitol building in Madison in the spring of 1952 with about 200 delegates in attendance. Until 1962, Wisconsin's Youth In Government program was held every other year. Beginning in 1962, it became an annual event. In 1989 the first Wisconsin Youth Supreme Court was held. Today the program has almost 300 students, advisors, and volunteers.

== Ohio-West Virginia Youth Leadership Association ==
The Ohio-West Virginia YMCA split from the national YMCA in 2013. The Youth Leadership Association operates a Youth In Government program in both Ohio and West Virginia. The organization operates the Horseshoe Leadership Center in Tucker County, West Virginia, the Cave Lake Center for Community Leadership in Pike County, Ohio, a Model United Nations program, school-based service organizations, and other educational programs promoting leadership, character, service, entrepreneurship, and philanthropy.

== Notable alumni ==
Several Youth and Government alumni have gone on to be elected to state and federal offices including the following:

- Former California State Controller Betty Yee
- D.C. Councilmember Janeese Lewis George
- Former Mayor of Sacramento Darrell Steinberg
- Speaker of the House Mike Johnson of Louisiana
- Former Congressman Donald Payne Jr. of New Jersey
- Administrator of the Environmental Protection Agency Lee Zeldin
- Former Governor Ralph Northam of Virginia
- Former Governor Steve Bullock of Montana
- Governor Andy Beshear of Kentucky
- Minnesota Secretary of State Steve Simon

Non-Political Notable Alumni:

- Miss Tennessee 2021 Tally Bevis Miss America

== See also ==
General or global terms

- Model United Nations
- MSC Student Conference on National Affairs
- Student voice
- Youth Council
- Youth Model Governments
- Youth voice

Other countries

- YMCA Youth Parliament - Australia
- YMCA NSW Youth Parliament - Australia
- British Columbia Youth Parliament - Canada
- TUXIS Parliament of Alberta - Canada
- Saskatchewan Youth Parliament - Canada
- Youth Parliament of Manitoba - Canada
