= British Columbia Youth Parliament =

The BCYP Mace

The British Columbia Youth Parliament (BCYP) is a youth service organization that operates in the guise of a "parliament" in the Canadian province of British Columbia. The BCYP fulfills its motto of "Youth Serving Youth" by means of "legislation" enacting community service projects and other youth-oriented activities. The BCYP is the successor to the Older Boys' Parliament of British Columbia, which first met in 1924 and originally went by the name "TUXIS Older Boys' Parliament.

== Annual session ==
Each year between December 27–31, youth aged 16 to 21 from across British Columbia gather in the Legislative Chambers of the B.C. Parliament Buildings in the capital city of Victoria for the BCYP annual session. Members sit as independents (i.e., they do not represent any political party) and vote according to their individual conscience on all issues. They learn about parliamentary process, debate topics of interest, and plan numerous activities for the upcoming year. Proposed activities, usually in the form of community service projects, are presented in the form of government bills; once passed they must be put into effect. This model differs from most other model (or "mock") youth parliaments in Canada; legislation passed by the membership is enacted by the organization through volunteer work in the community.

During the sittings of the BCYP during its December session, members of the BCYP (usually backbenchers) are given the opportunity to present "Private Members' Resolutions" (PMRs) for debate. These are usually on topics related to current events or other issues important to members and usually contain a provision for communicating the decision of the BCYP on that topic to the actual governmental authorities or other parties responsible for those issues. On occasion, a PMR on a whimsical topic is introduced.

Unlike a real parliamentary government, the BCYP "government" cannot fall if it loses a vote on what would otherwise be a vote of confidence, such as a money bill or a motion of non-confidence.

During the week that the BCYP meets in the Legislature, the members elect a new Premier, Leader of the Opposition and Deputy Speaker for the next legislative year.

On the last day of the annual sitting of the BCYP, a Prorogation ceremony is held. As part of the ceremony, the Lieutenant Governor (a person appointed by the Premier, usually a prominent person in the community) signs all approved bills into "law". After the December sittings, the members become the organization's own "civil service" and implement the community service projects legislated at the session. Legislation passed at the session is subject to review by the organization's Senate.

For most of the BCYP's history, the legislative year was referred to a "session"; however, in the mid-1990s the BCYP began referring to the annual session as a "parliament", in keeping with Parliamentary tradition.

== Organizational structure ==
The BCYP models itself on the Westminster Parliamentary system. The BCYP is sponsored by the Youth Parliament of B.C. Alumni Association. In keeping with the parliamentary structure of the BCYP, the board of directors of the Alumni Association is referred to as the "Senate".

The BCYP itself is led by a cabinet appointed by the Premier-elect. The Premier-elect also appoints various other officers, such as a Lieutenant Governor, a Speaker, a Clerk of the Legislative Assembly, and a Sergeant-At-Arms, among others. The legislative year for a Premier and their cabinet runs from September 15 to September 14 of the following year. The Premier and Cabinet plan the government's legislative plan and prepare the bills for consideration at the December sitting of the BCYP.

Members of the BCYP are not elected to the Youth Parliament. Instead, potential members apply for the limited number of available positions. Applicants must be nominated by an organization that supports youth activities (i.e., community, school, or church club or group). The applicants are then selected by a committee made up of representatives of the Senate and the BCYP cabinet. The selection committee attempts to ensure that all parts of the province are represented. This includes selecting at least one applicant from each of the real ridings for the actual provincial legislature (subject to there being an applicant from that riding). At the December sitting, all members will be assigned to a riding. Members who come from a riding that is over-represented (usually from one of the larger urban centres) may be assigned a riding from which no applications were submitted. Otherwise, some ridings may have two or more members.

== "Legislated" projects and programs ==
The purpose of the Older Boys' Parliament (OBP) in its early years was to recommend changes and additions to the "Canadian Standards Efficiency Training" (CSET) programme and to promote Christian life. Its legislation usually consisted of recommendations made to the Boys' Work Board of British Columbia ("BWBBC") (see History, below) rather than its own programmes, and occasional resolutions on social issues (such as temperance and school curricula).

During the 1950s, the OBP began to develop a more service-oriented programme run by its own members rather than working with programmes run by other organizations (the exception to this being camps). Projects included annual hobby shows, athletic competitions, leadership training programmes, and work with disabled youth.

The OBP's social service programme expanded in the 1960s, with more work with disabled people, delinquent boys, book drives, and food drives. The OBP's project for Canada's Centennial was to help finance and build a church and meeting hall on a Nitinagt Indian Reserve on Vancouver Island.

In 1981, the BCYP funded and constructed a playground for children living at Skeena Terrace, a provincially sponsored subsidized housing project at Cassiar and Broadway in Vancouver.

In the 1980s, the Youth Parliament projects expanded to include educational workshops, youth oriented conferences, and the Regional Youth Parliament (RYP) program. Projects introduced in the 2000s include summer youth festivals and essay contests. In 2005, the BCYP established a youth conference known as "The Stand".

=== Observers program ===
In 1959 the OBP created the Observers Program. The purpose of this program was to give potential members an idea of what OBP did before joining, to provide a "sounding board" to members for feedback, and as a means of reducing high turnover in OBP as becoming a member would become something to work for above observer status. Observers, aged 15 to 16, attended the entire session, and took part in all activities except sitting in the Legislative Chambers. The Observer program ended in 1973, at which time the Older Boys' Parliament became the Youth Parliament.

=== Camp Phoenix ===
While camping had been a steady part of the OBP program since its inception, the OBP had always participated in the operation of camps run by other organizations, but never its own. This changed in December 1967 when the 37th Session legislated Camp Phoenix. That first Camp Phoenix was held at Camp George Pringle in the summer of 1968, with 36 underprivileged and disabled boys in attendance.

Camp Phoenix expanded over the decades to serve both boys and girls. For a number of years, Camp Phoenix was held in August every year, often at a different location in British Columbia each year. Camp Phoenix was funded and organized by the BCYP members, with a few key positions at the camp itself (such as medical staff and camp director) held by alumni or other adults. From the first camp through 2010, approximately 1500 children attended Camp Phoenix. In 2011, BCYP decided not to hold Camp Phoenix. During 2014, BCYP operated an afternoon day-camp program as a potential replacement for Camp Phoenix, known as "Project Phoenix." At the 86th Session in December 2014, BCYP re-established the Ministry of Project Phoenix to formally oversee the new program, called "Project Phoenix". Based upon the success of Project Phoenix, at the 87th Session in December 2015, the BCYP re-established the Ministry of Camp Phoenix and the membership passed legislation enabling Camp Phoenix. Camp Phoenix occurred in August 2016 at Deep Cove, British Columbia.

=== Regional Youth Parliaments ===
In 1937, in an attempt to expand the number of people that could be involved, the OBP experimented by attempting to hold three separate parliaments around the province, instead of the one in Victoria. As a result of the hiatus during World War II, and the effort to rebuild the OBP in the late 1940s, no real thought was given to regional parliaments until the 1960s. During the late 1960s, into 1970, the Older Boys' Parliament made efforts to establish a regional program, but a program of regional parliaments never came to fruition.

The current form of the RYPs originated in 1987, when a pilot RYP was held in Creston, British Columbia for the Kootenay region. Legislation formally establishing a RYP program was introduced at the 60th Session in 1989. As before, a primary goal of the RYP program was to increase the number of young people who could participate in the BCYP. Since then, RYPs have been established throughout the province. The oldest RYP currently in existence is the Vancouver Youth Parliament, which has run without interruption since 1988. While a number of the early RYPs are defunct, the current Regional Youth Parliaments include:

- Vancouver Youth Parliament
- Richmond Delta Youth Parliament
- Fraser Youth Parliament
- Islands Youth Parliament
- Interior Youth Parliament (Formed from the merger of the former Northern British Columbia Youth Parliament and the Southern Interior Youth Parliament)

== History ==
=== Origin ===
Unofficial Coat of Arms of the BCYP

Like most other Youth Parliaments in Canada, the BCYP has its origins in the "boys work" movement of the YMCA of the late 19th and early 20th centuries. In fact, the TUXIS Older Boys' Parliament was active in the world-wide Boys' Work movement, sending Walter S. Owen as its delegate to the world conference in Helsinki, Finland, in 1921. Owen represented both the Older Boys' Parliament and the YMCA.

Taylor Statten, a Boer War recruit who joined the YMCA as a means of continuing his physical fitness activities upon military discharge, was driven by his ambition to design a proper boys' work program with the Toronto YMCA, attending various national boys conferences. In 1912, Statten became the Boys' Work Secretary on the national YMCA executive. Borrowing from both Canadian and American YMCA programs, and aspects of the Boy Scouts, Statten established the "Canadian Standards Efficiency Training" program, a system of graded tests where boys passed from one level to the next. These standards were borrowed from the "four-fold" philosophy.

Under the CSET program came the Trail Rangers (boys 12 - 14) and TUXIS (ages 15 – 17). A similar program for girls known as the Canadian Girls in Training were formed a number of years later. The popularity of the CSET program was such that boys' work soon became a virtually separate movement within the YMCA

In 1916 Statten embarked on a "Coast to Coast Tour" to promote the CSET program, which included a stop in Vancouver. It was on this tour that Statten first envisioned a national boys conference, modelled on various regional conferences promoting boys' work. Statten believed in letting the boys determine their own priorities, and his idea soon developed into the concept of a boys' Parliament. However, the National Boys' Work Board considered this beyond their capability, at least during the Great War, which was being waged at the time. Fortunately, the Ontario BWB was interested, and Statten organized the first Ontario TUXIS & Older Boys' Parliament in 1917.

Due to the program's success, Statten encouraged the involvement of the churches, in order to reach even more boys in Canada. Various Protestant churches became involved, and a National Boys' Work Board was established with an executive body made up of YMCA and church representatives. In 1921 an independent Boys' Work Board was established, as the YMCA preferred to take a lesser role in a movement that was diverting too much attention and resources from other Y programs.

=== Early years to World War II ===
The first Older Boys' Parliament of British Columbia was held in January 1924, originally under the "TUXIS" moniker. The Premier was Walter S. Owen, who later became the Lieutenant Governor of B.C. (1973–1978). The new organization was donated its mace, which is still used today, by St. Andrews Presbyterian (now the United Church), where Owen's TUXIS group met. An early patron of the organization was Robert Randolph Bruce, the Lieutenant Governor of British Columbia from 1926 to 1931.

During the Great Depression, a number of serious issues faced the OBP. These included lower financial resources. The OBP's ability to use the Legislative Chambers of the Legislative Assembly of British Columbia in the capital city of Victoria was threatened by those offended by the OBP allowing Asian members to attend. Before World War II, the OBP decided to experiment with holding its session outside of Victoria. A proposed session under this plan in New Westminster in 1937 had to be cancelled. Another planned experiment was to hold the OBP biannually, with regional Parliaments in alternate years. It is certain this practice would have continued were it not for the occurrence of World War II.

=== Post World War II to the end of the OBP era ===
While the 15th Session in 1939 prorogued with full intention of holding a Session in 1940, the OBP did not meet during World War II. By war's end, the TUXIS movement had diminished and the National Boys' Work Board was in a weak state of affairs. It took the Boys' Work Secretary for the United Church, Rev. Robert McLaren, to revive the OBP. Through his efforts, the pre-war partners who sponsored Parliament (Protestant churches and YMCA) joined forces to establish a Parliamentary Convention in Vancouver to rebuild the organization. It is in this period where the United Church began to have its greatest influence on the OBP.

Delegates from around B.C. attended this conference, which expanded to include representatives of other boys' groups such as Scouts and the Boys' Brigade. This expansion of OBP's base encouraged the boys to debate expanding its membership to include all religious denominations and boys' groups in the OBP and truly become a representative Parliament. This movement this was effectively quashed by McLaren and other church leaders.

The 1940s were an unstable period for the OBP, with a "senate" (as its sponsoring organization was called) existing in name only and a weak premier who had to be replaced soon after the 16th Session. Key alumni and strong premiers with good cabinets carried the OBP through the late 1940s when a proper "Senate" and well founded Parliament were established.

It was during this period that the OBP was held in Vancouver. Only one session between 1945 and 1955 sat in the provincial legislature. Despite invitations from the government, organizers found it easier to plan sessions for the fledgling parliament in Vancouver, usually at the University of British Columbia in Union College (now the Vancouver School of Theology) or the U.B.C. Law School Building.

=== Transition to BCYP ===
Since the 5th Session of the OBP, resolutions had been introduced to admit girls as members. By the 1960s the Canadian Girls in Training efforts to participate in the Older Boys' Parliament were taken up by the media, spearheaded by the Victoria Times newspaper columnist Elizabeth Forbes. By the late 1960s the issue was being taken more seriously by the OBP, but there was strong opposition from the "Senate", which vetoed a resolution passed by the OBP in 1971 to allow girls to join. Some of the "Older Boys" who opposed admitting women went as far as to organize a separate "Older Girls' Parliament" to meet during the Easter break.

At this same time, there was a movement to expand the constituent membership of the Boys' Parliament beyond the select churches providing members at the time. For example, by the late 1960s, there had been Lutheran, Jewish, and Catholic members of the OBP. These boys qualified for membership in the OBP by associating themselves with youth groups connected to the sponsoring organizations of the OBP.

With the election of the New Democratic Party under Dave Barrett in the 1972 provincial election, pressure came from the provincial government to open the membership of the Boys' Parliament to all or face losing the use of the legislative buildings. Thus the B.C. Youth Parliament came into being for the 44th Session in 1974. The new organization was non-denominational and membership was open to boys and girls. The first female Premier was Susan Hunter of the 49th Session in 1977.

As a part of the re-organization in 1974, the Youth Parliament of B.C. Alumni Association was formed and acts as the BCYP's "Senate". The Senate ensures a session is held annually, reviews the legislation passed by the Youth Parliament, and when necessary assists the Youth Parliament in its community service programs and other events.

=== To the present ===
Developments in the 1980s saw Taylor Statten's dreams of 1916 come to fruition with the formation of the Youth Parliament of Canada in 1980. The Western Canada Youth Parliament (WCYP) was also formed during this time period. While the Youth Parliament of Canada has since collapsed, after seven sessions over ten years, the WCYP continues on a bi-annual basis.

A key event in BCYP history was the "Vernon Conference" held in 1985. The BCYP organized and hosted this youth conference to celebrate the United Nations International Year of the Youth. Members of the TUXIS Parliament of Alberta (since renamed as the Alberta Youth Parliament) and the Junior Statesmen of America (now the Junior State of America were invited to participate. This conference was a new concept for the BCYP. It provided the BCYP with the experience and inspiration to attempt new projects beyond community service projects and camps. More and larger projects, such as RYPs, were possible.

In the 1990s, with increasing costs of running BCYP's annual Session and holding Camp Phoenix, both the Senate and Youth Parliament became increasingly concerned with fundraising and the long-term financial health of the organization. Starting with a $5,000 bequest from Walter S. Owen, the Senate instituted a fundraising campaign between 1991 and 1993. The campaign raised $75,000 in donations from alumni, service organizations, and corporations. The Vancouver Foundation matched that amount, to establish the Walter S. Owen Fund.

At that same time, the BCYP undertook new fundraising initiatives, such as holding a dinner-dance and "Dream Auction" in 1992. The auction subsequently evolved to become a major annual fundraising event for Youth Parliament.

== See also ==
- Youth Parliament of Canada/Parlement jeunesse du Canada
- History of Youth Work
