= OYP =

OYP may refer to:

- Ontario Youth Parliament, a Canadian provincial youth model parliament
- OYP, the IATA code for Saint-Georges-de-l'Oyapock Airport, French Guiana
