= Saskatchewan Youth Parliament =

Youth debating organization in Canada

The Saskatchewan Youth Parliament (SYP) is a non-partisan organization of young people that meets to discuss and debate political and social issues. Members learn about the mechanics of government, such as parliamentary procedure, decision making, and the rules of debate in a parliamentary democracy. Additionally, members are exposed to a variety of viewpoints from youth from around Saskatchewan. At its annual Christmas session, SYP members are given the privilege of debating at the Saskatchewan Legislature in Regina, in the same seats as the real Members of the Legislative Assembly. SYP is run for youth by youth by a cabinet elected at the Annual Christmas Session each year. Cabinet does everything from planning the events, to finances and communications.

According to its mission statement:

The Saskatchewan Youth Parliament is a non-partisan, not-for-profit, youth-run organization. SYP provides the opportunity for youth across the province to expand their knowledge of parliamentary procedure while fostering good citizenship. The organization is dedicated to developing leadership and public speaking skills among youth. While striving to create an inclusive environment, members forge lasting relationships based on cooperative learning and mutual respect.

== History ==
SYP first met in 1912 as the Saskatchewan Older Boys' Parliament. However, it had a shaky beginning and collapsed after a few years of existence.

In 1923, SYP was revived under the TUXIS movement as an organisation for Christian boys. That Christmas, the session was held at the Saskatchewan Legislature, where it has been held almost every year since.

There were no sessions of the SYP during the Great Depression and World War II. This resulted in a fifteen-year gap between the 8th and 9th sessions of the SYP. It was not until 1945 that the SYP met again. At that time, the Saskatchewan Older Boys' Parliament began its evolution towards what is now called SYP. There were many spirited debates on whether to admit females, non-Christians and smokers. The members at the time decided to allow smokers to join but not females or non-Christians.

In 1969, the members of the Saskatchewan Older Boys' Parliament debated a resolution that would permit young women to join the organisation. One of the members at the time was former Saskatchewan premier Lorne Calvert, who gave a (reportedly tongue in cheek) speech against admitting female members. It was not until 1972 that females and non-Christians were allowed to join. At that time, the name was changed to Saskatchewan Youth Parliament.

In 1987, SYP celebrated its 75th anniversary. To celebrate, a reunion was held which brought together different generations of SYP alumni. Soon afterward, a new draft constitution and standing orders were prepared. These came into effect in 1988.

In 2012, SYP celebrated its 100th anniversary with a special reunion in Regina at the Saskatchewan Legislative Building, being the first people in Saskatchewan to use the new green carpet that had been installed in the legislative chamber.

Throughout the years, a number of SYP alumni have become notable political leaders, including former Prime Minister the Right Honourable John Diefenbaker; former Clerk of the Legislature, Clerk of the Senate, Secretary of the University of Saskatchewan, Lieutenant-Governor of Saskatchewan, and former acting President of the University of Saskatchewan, His Honour, the Honourable Dr. Gordon Barnhart; former MP Simon De Jong; former Federal Cabinet Minister and current Deputy Leader of the Opposition Ralph Goodale; former Premier Lorne Calvert; former MLA and cabinet minister Mark Wartman; and Minister of Environment Ken Cheveldayoff. Many other former members have also made their mark on Saskatchewan and Canada as lawyers, diplomats, teachers, and journalists.

In light of the COVID-19 Pandemic, SYP took a hiatus given the health concerns in running group events.

In 2023 SYP is returning. This includes with a chance to have the Annual Session take place over the Family Day Long weekend, rather than the traditional Christmas time period.

== Annual events ==
SYP has four events each year, the biggest being the Annual Session in Regina, Saskatchewan. At Session the members take part in a number of activities, which include debate of resolutions in the Saskatchewan Legislature and cabinet elections. Session is also the opportunity for the organization to debate legislation that affects the operation of the organization, including the annual budget and the acts governing each cabinet portfolio. Session functions as SYP's annual general meeting, and outcomes of legislation debates are binding on the organization.

The topics for debate are chosen by the members themselves at the event and are often related to topics that are of interest or are featured in the news. For example, switching to a nuclear-based energy system was a favourite debate resolution during the early 1990s. Other perennial topics include the death penalty, abortion, and the legalization of marijuana.

The three other events held throughout the year take place in March, May and November. These are called "Minis" because each is held over a weekend is like a miniature Session. The location of the March and May minis vary each year, but tend to be either a north–south town or city or an East/West town or city. Mini debates are of resolutions and not SYP's legislation.

The November Mini is typically held in Saskatoon and is the yearly Tri-Provincial event. Saskatchewan Youth Parliament invites the Youth Parliament of Manitoba and the Alberta Youth Parliament to join them in a weekend of debating.

There are also Cabinet meetings held in January, July and September, as well as at each official event as a time for the Executive Council (Cabinet) to discuss the running of Saskatchewan Youth Parliament. There is also an annual Board meeting of the Chief Returning Officer, Premier and other board members, which includes a report from the Minister of Finance.

== Notable alum ==
- John Diefenbaker: Prime Minister of Canada
- Ralph Goodale: former federal Finance Minister, former federal Minister of Public Safety
- Lorne Calvert: former Premier of Saskatchewan
- Gordon Barnhart: former President University of Saskatchewan, former Lieutenant Governor of Saskatchewan, former Secretary of the University of Saskatchewan, former Clerk of the Senate of Canada, former Clerk of the Legislature of Saskatchewan
- Scott Banda: CEO, Federated Co-operatives
- Arielle Zerr: CJME Sports Reporter
- Fletcher Kent: Global New Reporter in Edmonton
- Michael Zwaagstra: public high school teacher, education researcher and author, deputy mayor of Steinbach, Manitoba
- Simon De Jong: former member of Parliament
- Ken Cheveldayoff: Current MLA for Saskatoon Willowgrove

== See also ==
- Youth Parliament of Canada/Parlement jeunesse du Canada
- History of Youth Work
- Model parliament
