= Youth Parliament of Canada =

Youth Parliament

The Youth Parliament of Canada/Parlement jeunesse du Canada (YPJ Canada) was a youth model parliament that met biennially, and later annually, in the 1980s. The delegates to YPJ Canada were drawn mostly from the eight provincial youth parliaments then operating in Canada.

Logo from the cover of the journal of the 1980 session of YPJ Canada.

YPJ Canada Logo in 1984 – In use until the demise of the organization

In 1977, representatives from seven of the eight youth parliaments met to discuss the organization of a national youth parliament. This meeting resulted in the creation of the National Youth Parliament Association (NYPA). The NYPA was a federally incorporated non-profit organization. Two representatives from each provincial youth parliament were appointed as directors of the NYPA, who in turn appointed a six-member executive.

The first session of YPJ Canada met during August 16–23, 1980. The 110 delegates, met in the Senate chambers of the Canadian Parliament Buildings in Ottawa. YPJ Canada modeled itself on the Westminster Parliamentary system, adopting its own rules based upon House of Commons procedures. While YPJ Canada had a prime minister, Leader of the Opposition, cabinet, shadow cabinet, and committee system similar to a real parliament, the members of YPJ Canada did not represent any political parties. At all times, each member, including cabinet ministers, was entitled to vote according to conscience.

YPJ Canada usually had eight cabinet ministers, one from each of the provincial youth parliaments. Each minister would introduce "legislation" for debate. Unlike some of the provincial youth parliaments, YPJ Canada legislation was never for the establishment of any form of ongoing project. The bills would be limited to the consideration of local, national and international issues of the day. Debates occurred in both English and French, with simultaneous translation available for all delegates.

By the late 1980s, the NYPA was unable to raise the funds necessary to sponsor the annual YPJ Canada sessions. This, among other reasons, led to the collapse of YPJ Canada. The 8th session held in the summer of 1990 was billed as the "10th anniversary session". The following session was the last.

== See also ==
- Western Canada Youth Parliament
- British Columbia Youth Parliament
- TUXIS Parliament of Alberta
- Saskatchewan Youth Parliament
- Youth Parliament of Manitoba
- Ontario Youth Parliament
- Parlement Jeunesse du Québec
- Newfoundland and Labrador Youth Parliament
- Maritime Youth Parliament
