= Ontario Youth Parliament =

- Abbreviation: OYP
- Predecessor: Older Boys' Parliament
- Formation: 1969
- Type: Model parliament
- Premier: Matthew Tyhurst
- Leader of the Opposition: Shriyans Dash
- Affiliations: Youth Parliament of Canada
- Website: www.oyp.on.ca

The Ontario Youth Parliament (OYP), formerly the Ontario Older Boys' Parliament, is one of a number of provincial youth model parliaments across Canada. Each year, the organization holds a four-day debate conference on Family Day weekend for youth ages 14 to 21 from Ontario, Canada. The organization has roots within the United Church of Canada dating back to 1907. The first session of the Older Boys' Parliament met in the Ontario Legislative Building at Queen's Park in Toronto in January 1925. As a result, the OYP, as successor to the Older Boys' Parliament, is one of the oldest youth parliaments in Canada. Gordon Lapp of Brighton served as the first Premier.

In 1969, the Older Boys' Parliament was succeeded by the OYP and is now a non-denominational Christian-based organization that is open to participants of all faiths. It combines components of parliament-style debate, social and leadership development activities and exploration of spirituality. The debate is modeled after the Legislative Assembly of Ontario, with mock legislation written by members of the youth cabinet on current issues facing youth in Canada. Social activities include two dances and a formal banquet, secret friends, and team-building games. The spiritual side of OYP is addressed through open nightly discussion on the theme chosen for that year and attendance at the host church's worship service.

== Organization ==
OYP has long operated as a non-denominational organization, although it maintains a spiritual element and relationship with the United Church as reflected in activities such as vespers. The Ontario Youth Parliament is overseen by a registered charitable organization, the executive of which is styled as a "senate". Delegates attend the annual session to debate legislation prepared by the cabinet, which is composed of delegates to the session.

=== Senate ===
While the cabinet plans and runs each year's parliamentary session, the senate monitors the association's long term needs; specifically, maintaining policies and procedures, managing finances, and overseeing public relations. The senate is composed of the cabinet and any other interested parties, typically OYP alumni. To ensure that the organization remains "for youth, by youth," the cabinet always forms the majority of the senate. To perform the duties of the senate between meetings, a seven member board of directors is elected in rotation at senate meetings and sittings of OYP.

=== Cabinet ===
The cabinet is composed of youth eligible to be delegates. The cabinet has the task of organizing the logistic, fiscal and legislative components of the parliament. In order to facilitate this task, cabinet meets four times between each year's session. To select and lead this group, a five member executive is elected by the delegates at each annual sitting. This group consists of the Premier, the Leader of the Opposition (colloquially known as the Lofo), the Registrar and Minister of Finance, the Minister of Individual Discipleship, and the Government House Leader.

=== Delegates ===
The third group is composed of youth aged 14–21 whom are collectively referred to as delegates. Delegates attend only the main event on Family Day weekend and, along with members of cabinet, participate in debate over the legislation.

=== Annual sessions ===
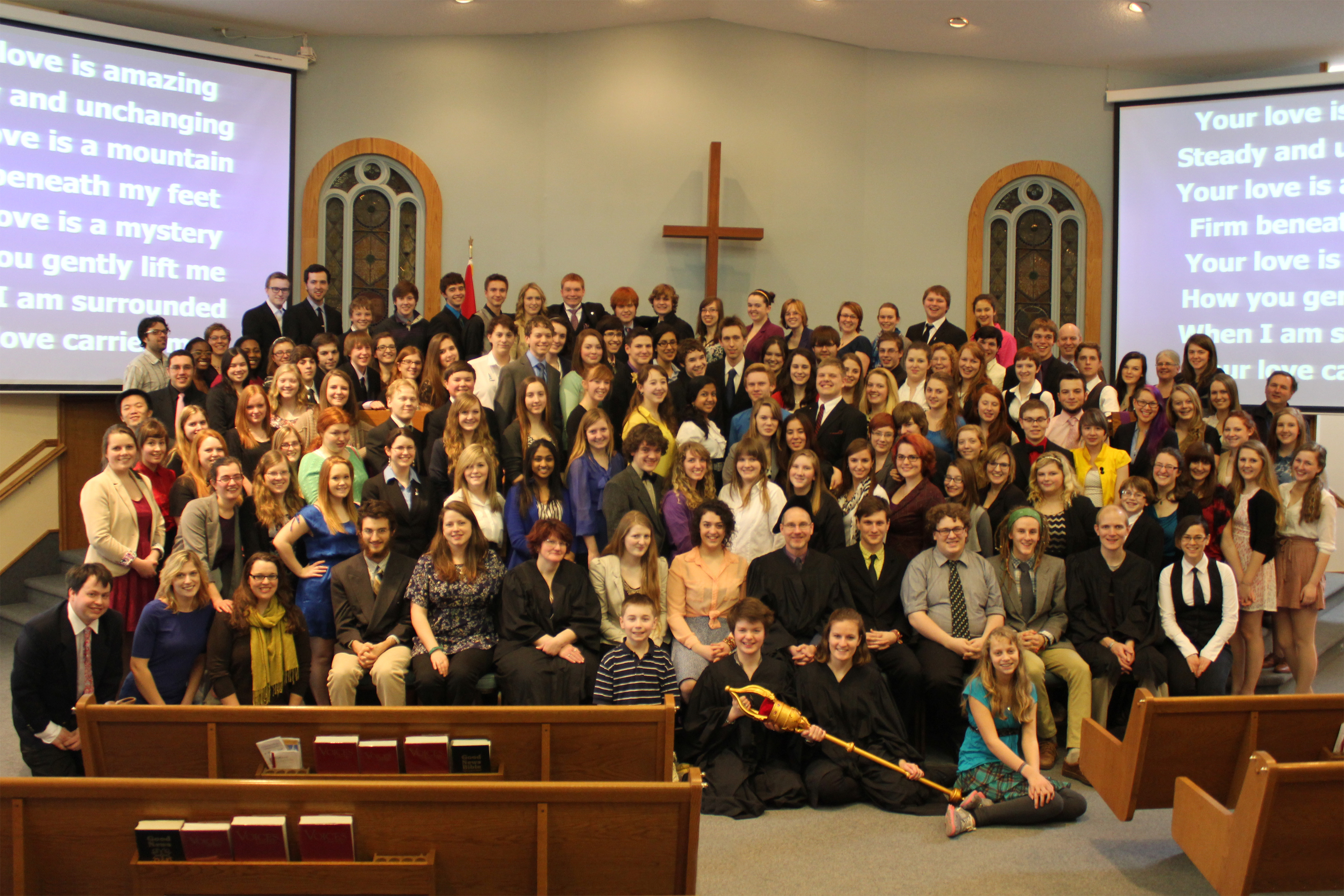
Group photo for Ontario Youth Parliament 2013

Ontario Youth Parliament is held each year from Friday to Monday on the Family Day weekend in February. Sessions are open to the public.

The structure of OYP matches that of constitutional tradition of the House of Commons, with a government, opposition, speaker and pages. The parliament is traditionally opened by a person acting as lieutenant-governor, a role that has been played by figures such as Moderator Robert McClure and Governor General Roland Michener.

Legislation is prepared throughout the year by the cabinet, usually centred around topics relevant to young people. Delegates at OYP have debated controversial political issues such as gay rights, environmental regulations and aboriginal autonomy. At the session, bills are presented and debated at several different sittings throughout the weekend. OYP is nonpartisan, which means that each delegate can express their opinion and vote freely. At the end of each debate, all delegates vote on whether the legislation should be passed or defeated. Any legislation passed by the majority is sent to the appropriate government offices in Toronto and Ottawa.

== History ==
OYP is the successor organization of the Older Boys' Parliament of Ontario, which began in 1921 as a youth program within the United Church of Canada. The Older Boys' Parliament movement, which began in Western Canada and moved eastward, was an extension of the Trail Rangers and TUXIS programs of various churches.

Among the early participants of Older Boys' Parliaments was Prime Minister John Diefenbaker, who later recalled: "Few of the opportunities open ... for self-improvement and participation for a full role as contributing members of the Canadian community are more rewarding than participation in the ... [youth] parliament." Other notable supporters were MP Douglas Abbott and Ontario MPPs Irwin Haskett and Claude Bennett.

=== TUXIS ===
The first model parliament was organized in 1912 by the United Church as the TUXIS Boys' Parliament. In October 1918 the Trail Rangers and TUXIS programs were implemented by Taylor Statten and Wallace Forgie under the covering name of "Canadian Standard Efficiency Training" (CSET). The four main focuses of the program were the intellectual, physical, spiritual and social aspects of boyhood. Within a decade, thousands of boys were participating in leadership training courses, summer camps and other activities run through CSET programs in a number of provinces. By 1928, there were over 2,000 registered groups with a total enrollment of roughly 30,000 boys across Canada.

The TUXIS Boys' Parliament held in Ontario in 1917 officially transformed CSET into the Trail Rangers and TUXIS program. Three years later, the National Boys' Work Board of the Religious Education Council of Canada was established as an interfaith group composed of representatives of the Anglican and United Churches as well as the YMCA. The Ontario Boys' Work Board sponsored the TUXIS and subsequent Older Boys' Parliament programs throughout the mid-20th century.

Taylor Statten believed that boys themselves should be given the responsibility of a leadership role in making decisions about the CSET program and that adult advisors should not impose their opinions and ideas on the young people. Out of this basic philosophy, the concept of Older Boys' Parliament was born.

=== Older Boys' Parliament ===
The Older Boys' Parliaments were given the authority to legislate for the CSET program and to become the vehicle of government and planning. They became one of the most important phases of the CSET movement, with party leaders citing extensive involvement in the Trail Rangers and TUXIS programs. At annual parliamentary sessions, boys were selected as representatives of their local churches and then gathered to work out ideas for the CSET program and debate the issues of the day. Throughout the 20th century, the method of selecting delegates varied from boys running in elections to being hand-picked from denominational groups. As well as providing leadership training and a chance to look at issues from a Christian point of view, these mock parliaments gave youth a chance to see other parts of their province and their country.

The first parliamentary session in Ontario was the TUXIS Boys' Parliament held in 1917. In the following decades, the movement grew to include eight organizations across the country. In 1924 the Ontario Older Boys' Parliament opposed a suggestion that a national Boys' Parliament be convened because of expenses and the difficulty of getting representation from all over Canada.

The Older Boys' Parliaments were very much part of a Christian milieu. Sessions included boys from Anglican, Baptist, Presbyterian and United Churches, and a significant portion of debate focused on church programs. They drew criticism for purporting to represent an entire province, using legislative and administrative buildings for annual sessions, and then excluding boys whose religious scruples made it impossible to participate.

By the 1930s, Older Boys' Parliaments had loosened their ties with TUXIS and young men from outside the United Church began to attend, although funding continued to come from Christian sources such as the United Church and The Salvation Army. In 1958 the Ontario Older Boys' Parliament began to work amongst boys outside of the church groups to which it had previously confined its activities.

More than just a governing body for the CSET program, the Older Boys' Parliament became regarded as an organization that facilitated "a real understanding of the meaning of democracy," teaching a respect for democratic values such as tolerance for dissent and the protection of the individual. For example, the Saskatchewan Older Boys' Parliament urged members to participate actively in politics as informed and open-minded voters.

The leaders of the Older Boys' Parliament movement saw themselves as training "the leaders of tomorrow." Alumni from the 1960s cited their involvement with the organization as the spark for an interest in world issues, as well as the foundation of their communication skills.

=== Ontario Youth Parliament ===
By the 1950s, the idea of cooperating with girls' groups such as Canadian Girls in Training or allowing girls to join the organization began to emerge. In 1968, the decision was made to open the Ontario Older Boys' Parliament to both boys and girls. (Note: "Students say Ontario education 'inadequate'". The Windsor Star. 19 March 1974. The group was originally called the Ontario Interdenominational Co-Educational Youth Conference; its name was changed to Ontario Youth Parliament in 1974.) This was a contentious issue at the time. In that same year, delegates of the Saskatchewan Older Boys' Parliament argued both for and against the involvement of women in parliament, defeating a resolution to include girls for a one-year trial basis. (Note: "Older Boys greet guests at conference". The Leader-Post. Regina, SK. 23 October 1972. The Saskatchewan Older Boys' Parliament allowed girls to join four years later, in 1972.) The same debate was occurring in the British Columbia and Alberta Older Boys' Parliaments as they sought to meet societal changes.

OYP became known for building leadership skills, teaching parliamentary procedure and exposing young people to new ideas. OYP continues challenged delegates to debate ethical and moral issues that they had previously not considered.

Before the introduction of Family Day as a provincial holiday in 2008, OYP was held on the first weekend of March break. In the late 20th century attendance was around 150 delegates, and remained at that level until decreasing abruptly in the years preceding 2006.

==== Regional parliaments ====
Between 1980 and 2006, OYP held five regional parliaments across Ontario each year. Though each regional parliament was distinct in its traditions, the Ontario Youth Parliament Association regulated each parliament through the Regionals Act. The original five regionals were: South Western Ontario Regional Parliament (SWORP); South Central Ontario Parliament for Youth (SCOPY); Central Ontario Regional Parliament (CORP); Eastern Ontario Regional Youth Parliament (EORYP); and, Northern Ontario Regional Parliament (NORP). Due to low registration, SCOPY and CORP planned to hold their 2005 session jointly as South Central Ontario Regional Parliament for Youth (SCORPY), however, the session never occurred. EORYP was the only regional to occur in 2006 and became OYP's last regional parliament.

== See also ==
- Youth Parliament of Canada/Parlement jeunesse du Canada
