= Youth Parliament of Manitoba =

- Formation: Founded: 1922; 104 years ago; Incorporated: August 22, 1984; 42 years ago
- Legal status: Registered charity
- Board of directors: Sarah Fontaine-Sinclair (Chairperson); Maxcyn Gualdrapa (Director of Finance); Lien Huynh (Vice-Chairperson); Aiden Peters (Director of Procedures)
- Website: https://www.ypmanitoba.ca
- Formerly called: Older Boys' TUXIS Parliament of Manitoba (1922–1960); Older Boys' Parliament of Manitoba (1960–1972); Youth Parliament of Manitoba and Northwestern Ontario (1972–2003)

Youth Parliament of Manitoba Inc. (YPM) is a non-partisan, non-denominational, and incorporated registered charity based in Manitoba, Canada.

Its mission is "to foster amongst the youth of Manitoba an understanding of, interest in, and engagement with the Canadian democratic parliamentary process that would enable their active participation in society as responsible citizens. In so doing, YPM strives to encourage the growth of the individual and their abilities through their exposure to a diversity of ideas and perspectives and the fellowship of their peers."

== Activities ==
YPM's flagship event is Session, an annual model parliament that takes place from December 26 to 31 each year at the Manitoba Legislature open to all Manitoban youth aged 16 to 20. During Session, participants ("members") debate mock legislation according to parliamentary procedure as per YPM's Standing Orders. Throughout the week, members also have the opportunity to meet current and former politicians from the Manitoba Legislature and the House of Commons, partake in workshops, and socialize with fellow youth from across the province.

Every summer, YPM hosts Speaker's Night, its premier fundraising gala. Proceeds go towards supporting YPM's programming, financial aid capabilities, and operating costs. Recent keynote speakers have included Dr. Annette Trimbee, Susan Thompson, Senator Marilou McPhedran, Dr. Aimée Craft, and Wab Kinew.

YPM is a founding member of the Western Canada Youth Parliament and current Member Parliament of its successor, Canada Youth Parliament. In this capacity, it assists in the organization of, and nominates delegates to, the biennial Canada Youth Parliament.

== History ==
In 1922, George Stewart, Lieutenant Governor of the Older Boys’ TUXIS Parliament of Manitoba, opened the first of a long line of annual sessions devoted to the development of leadership and awareness of the parliamentary system among the young men (and later, women) of Manitoba. It has since become one of the oldest Youth Parliaments in a network of similar organizations stretching across the country and the world. Although each of these Parliaments has a unique style and emphasis, all are based on the same basic principle of fostering knowledge of the parliamentary system amongst Canadian youth.

The Older Boys’ Parliament program began in Ontario as part of the TUXIS (“Training Under Christ In Service”) movement. Its original sponsors included various Protestant churches, such as the United Church of Canada, the Anglican, Baptist, Presbyterian, and Lutheran churches, the Salvation Army, and a variety of service groups such as the YMCA, De Molay and Kiwanis organizations. The movement's goal was to foster the development of the physical, mental, spiritual and social well-being of the person as inspired by the biblical passage Luke 2:52, which reads: “And Jesus increased in wisdom and in years, and in divine and human favour.” YPs, only one of many TUXIS activities, were designed for religious as well as parliamentary training. Though most YPs were at one time part of the TUXIS movement, only the TUXIS Youth Parliament of Alberta retains the name to this day.

In 1960, “TUXIS” was dropped from the name, leaving “Older Boys’ Parliament.” In 1968, it was decided that YPM would expand its focus by becoming open to youth from non-Protestant backgrounds, thereby becoming non-denominational. This meant that the Oath of Allegiance and the legislation placed before the house was no longer written for specific religious groups and with specifically religious purposes in mind.

On December 28, 1972, a special meeting of the organization was held to officially admit women as full members and to change the organization’s name to Youth Parliament of Manitoba and Northwestern Ontario (YPMNO). Previously, female members had for some years been allowed to attend session but only as associate members who did not hold the right to vote on the matters debated in the house. Seven years later, Ann Thompson became the first female Premier of YPMNO.

In celebration of its 60th anniversary in 1981, YPMNO hosted a first-of-its-kind invitational session for all YPs in Western Canada. Two years later, the Western Canada Youth Parliament (WCYP) was officially formed, with its second session being hosted again in Winnipeg in the chambers of City Council. Our organization has since hosted WCYP on three other occasions, in 1993, 2002 and most recently in 2010.

The organization successfully incorporated in 1984 and gained full charitable status. In 2003, the organization voted to shorten its name to Youth Parliament of Manitoba (YPM).

In 2007, YPM hosted its first annual Spring Session in Manitoba. In 2008, YPM hosted its first annual Speaker’s Night fundraising dinner. In 2019, it elected its first all-female Executive. In 2021, it celebrated its 100th annual Session.

== Past Premiers ==
| Year | Parliament | Premier | Lieutenant Governor |
|---|---|---|---|
| 1922 | 1 | E.A. Armstrong | George H. Stewart |
| 1923 | 2 | Erie L. Jackson | John Martin |
| 1924 | 3 | Frank Fidler | J. H. Dowler |
| 1925 | 4 | Darwin Chase | R. G. Taylor |
| 1926 | 5 | John Gilmer | The Hon. F. M. Black |
| 1927 | 6 | John Gilmer | Judge F. A. E. Hamilton |
| 1928 | 7 | John Dunderdale | J. L. Bathgate |
| 1929 | 8 | William Moore Benidickson | Dr. John Mackay |
| 1930 | 9 | Vivian M. Rogers | Prof. Watson Kirkconnell |
| 1931 | 10 | Mervyn Sprung | Magistrate R. B. Graham |
| 1932 | 11 | Donald Ross | C. R. Sayer |
| 1933 | 12 | George S. Thurton | Canon H. G. G. Herkots |
| 1934 | 13 | Joseph Benson | Rev. J. W. Clarke |
| 1935 | 14 | James M Taylor | Rev. J. W. Little |
| 1936 | 15 | J. S. McArdle | B. V. Richardson |
| 1937 | 16 | Donald L. Mackay | C. E. Stockdill |
| 1938 | 17 | Wilson Milne | C. N. Halstead |
| 1939 | 18 | Raymond Threson | E. J. J. Glenesk |
| 1940 | 19 | Frederick Tallman | The Hon. Sidney Earle Smith, P.C. |
| 1941 | 20 | Aitken Harvey | A. C. Campbell |
| 1942 | 21 | Frederick Bickell | Prof. A.. R. Cragg |
| 1943 | 22 | Maurice Helston | Rev. George A. MacMillan |
| 1944 | 23 | Lynn Watt | Dr. Robert Fletcher |
| 1945 | 24 | Thomas Goulding | The Hon. D. C. McKenzie |
| 1946 | 25 | Garth Campbell | Arch. J. Barr |
| 1947 | 26 | Robert H. Johnson | John A. M. Edwards |
| 1948 | 27 | William Norrie | E. H. Morgan |
| 1949 | 28 | J. A. C. Magee | C. H. P. Killick |
| 1950 | 29 | Doug Mauchlan | Prof. R. Fletcher |
| 1951 | 30 | Alan G. Gardiner | Dr. W. C. Graham |
| 1952 | 31 | Harry T. Makin | Nelson Mc Ewen |
| 1953 | 32 | Victor Mearon | Mayor N. J. Black |
| 1954 | 33 | Robert A. Steen | Canon L. F. Wilmont |
| 1955 | 34 | Lawrie Smith | H. L. Mackinnon |
| 1956 | 35 | Waldron Fox-Decent | Dr. W. C. Lockhart |
| 1957 | 36 | Don King | C. G. Carter |
| 1958 | 37 | Graeme Garson | T. M. Miller |
| 1959 | 38 | Doug McEwan | Dr. H. H. Saunderson |
| 1960 | 39 | Lloyd Axworthy | Dr. Earl J. Treusch |
| 1961 | 40 | Mike Quiggin | D. L. Campbell |
| 1962 | 41 | Denis Corrie | Prof. W. L. Morton |
| 1963 | 42 | Bruce Doern | The Hon. Stanley H. Knowles, P.C. |
| 1964 | 43 | Neil Gailbraith | Rev. J. O. Anderson |
| 1965 | 44 | Gary Scherbain | The Hon. Errick Willis |
| 1966 | 45 | Jim Lightbody | Dr. D. B. Macdonald |
| 1967 | 46 | Hugh Stephens | Bishop Antoine Hacault |
| 1968 | 47 | Tom Axworthy | Magistrate Isaac Rice |
| 1969 | 48 | Philip Reece | Dr. George Johnson |
| 1970 | 49 | Bob Williamson | Dean C. Edwards |
| 1971 | 50 | John Romanow | Charles Hubband |
| 1972 | 51 | Ron Miller | Rev. D. O. Reece |
| 1973 | 52 | Laurie Swardfager | Juiles Koteles |
| 1974 | 53 | Paul DuVal | Dr. Ben Hog |
| 1975 | 54 | Chris Guest | Muriel Smith |
| 1976 | 55 | Andrew Treusch | Judge Peter Teraska |
| 1977 | 56 | Gordon Du Val | The Rt. Hon. Edward Schreyer, P.C., C.C., C.M.M., O.M., C.D. |
| 1978 | 57 | Dave Najduch | Paul DuVal, Sr. |
| 1979 | 58 | Ann Thompson | The Hon. Lloyd Axworthy, P.C., O.C., O.M., Norman Axworthy |
| 1980 | 59 | Ian Manson | Olga Fuga |
| 1981 | 60 | Darren Praznik | Judge Graeme Carson |
| 1982 | 61 | Jim Bell | Dr. Carl Ridd |
| 1983 | 62 | Bruce Johannson | The Hon. Gildas Molgat, P.C. |
| 1984 | 63 | Dmytro Dutka | William Norrie, C.M., O.M., Q.C. |
| 1985 | 64 | Patricia Chaychuk | Hon. William Blakie, P.C., M.P. |
| 1986 | 65 | Erminia Pallone | Gary Filmon |
| 1987 | 66 | Nasir Faruqui | The Hon. Sharon Carstairs, P.C. |
| 1988 | 67 | Glen Hickerson | Prof. Jack London, Q.C. |
| 1989 | 68 | Sean Crick | Howard Pawley, P.C. Q.C. |
| 1990 | 69 | Michelle Elvers-Crick | The Hon. Murray Sinclair |
| 1991 | 70 | James Muir | Waldron Fox-Decent, C.M., C.M.M., O.M., C.D. |
| 1992 | 71 | Christine Barnson | Gary Doer |
| 1993 | 72 | J.P. Lapointe | Terry Duguid |
| 1994 | 73 | Mark Matz | Philip Weiss |
| 1995 | 74 | Cindy Fleury | Bruce C. Daniels |
| 1996 | 75 | Darcy Rollins | Dr. Robert J. Young |
| 1997 | 76 | Nichole Cyr | Richard Cloutier |
| 1998 | 77 | Ken Yost | Darren Praznik |
| 1999 | 78 | Alan Fehr | Prof. Donald Bailey |
| 2000 | 79 | Donna Chanas | John Perry |
| 2001 | 80 | Mercedes Alcock | Patricia Chaychuck |
| 2002 | 81 | Micah Melnyk | Ann Thompson |
| 2003 | 82 | Michael Feuerstein | Erminia Johannson |
| 2004 | 83 | Carlee-ann Dueck | Philip Reece |
| 2005 | 84 | Michael Urban | Dave Najduch |
| 2006 | 85 | Dana Gregoire | Bob Haverluck |
| 2007 | 86 | Katie Szilagyi | Dr. Bruce W. Warner |
| 2008 | 87 | Amy Dhillon | Mark Matz |
| 2009 | 88 | Jennifer Pawluk | Andrew Treusch |
| 2010 | 89 | Darcy Vermeulen | Ruth Wilson |
| 2011 | 90 | Darren Haber | Darcy Rollins |
| 2012 | 91 | Bojan Pirnat | Donna Chanas |
| 2013 | 92 | Andrew Jones | Muriel Smith |
| 2014 | 93 | Brent Hardy | Sachit Mehra |
| 2015 | 94 | Kamal Dhillon | Clif Evans |
| 2016 | 95 | Joseph Broda | Dr. Kristel van Ineveld |
| 2017 | 96 | Ariel Melamedoff | Paulo Fernandes |
| 2018 | 97 | Adrienne Tessier | Dr. Aimée Craft |
| 2019 | 98 | Deborah Tsao | Amy Dhillon |
| 2020 | 99 | Abigaïl Theano-Pudwill | Stuart Olmstead |
| 2021 | 100 | Nina Lam | Dr. Brent Roussin |
| 2022 | 101 | Jacob Harvey | The Hon. Murray Sinclair |
| 2023 | 102 | Josephine Zhao | Dr. Katie Szilagyi |
| 2024 | 103 | Xiao Zhang | Alicia Dueck-Read |
| 2025 | 104 | Charlize Medina | Dave Shuttleworth |

== Organizational structure ==
YPM bases its organizational structure and nomenclature on the Westminster parliamentary system. The membership structure of YPM is made up of three main components: the Executive, the Cabinet, and Backbenchers. All members of YPM are between the ages of 16 and 25.

=== Executive ===
Youth Parliament of Manitoba Inc. is governed by a five-person Executive, who legally function as the corporation's board of directors. Each person is elected for a one-year term by and from the membership on the last day of Session. All directors are volunteers between the ages of 18 and 25. The positions on the board are:

- the Past-Chairperson (Speaker),
- the Chairperson (Premier),
- the Director of Finance (Deputy Speaker),
- the Vice-Chairperson (Deputy Premier), and
- the Director of Procedures (House Leader).

=== Cabinet ===
The Cabinet is YPM's volunteer organizing committee, appointed by the Executive from the members (attendees) of the previous Session. The Cabinet assists the Executive in organizing and holding Session. Current Cabinet portfolios include:

- Ministry of Alumni Affairs
- Ministry of Communications
- Ministry of Defence
- Ministry of External Affairs
- Ministry of Government Services
- Ministry of Human Resources
- Ministry of Internal Affairs
- Ministry of Agri-Food
- Ministry of Publications
- Ministry of Public Relations
- Ministry of Revenue
- Ministry of Supply and Service
- Ministry of Reconciliation
- Registrar General
- Secretary of State
- Whips (Armstrong and Thompson)

=== Backbenchers ===
All non-Executive and non-Cabinet members of YPM sit as Backbenchers during Session.

== Dignitaries ==
=== Lieutenant governor ===
Each year, the board of directors invites a distinguished member of the community (in recent years, often a former member) to act as the lieutenant governor (LG). The LG officially opens and prorogues the session, reads the Speech from the Throne, and makes a brief presentation to the membership.

=== Honorary president ===
The honorary president (HP) is a prominent citizen of Manitoba who serves as an advisor for the organization. At Session, they attend the opening and closing ceremonies.

=== Traditional Knowledge Keeper ===
The Traditional Knowledge Keeper advises the organization on reconciliation with Indigenous peoples in Manitoba. At Session, they conduct a traditional Indigenous teaching on the first and last days.

== Notable alumni ==
Many of YPM's past members have gone on to successful careers in a variety of fields. Some of the organization's prominent past members include:

- Lloyd Axworthy (former Canadian Minister of Foreign Affairs, former president and vice-chancellor of the University of Winnipeg)
- Bill Norrie (39th Mayor of Winnipeg)
- Tom Axworthy (principal secretary to Pierre Trudeau from 1981 to 1984)
- Robert Steen (38th Mayor of Winnipeg, former Member of the Legislative Assembly of Manitoba for St. Matthews)
- Wally Fox-Decent (former chair of the Workers Compensation Board of Manitoba)
- Howard Pawley (18th Premier of Manitoba, 28th Attorney-General of Manitoba, former Member of the Legislative Assembly of Manitoba for Selkirk)

By decision of the Board, former members of YPM who have made outstanding contributions to the organization are eligible to be appointed to the organization's Senate.

== See also ==
- Parlement jeunesse franco-manitobain
- Youth Parliament of Canada/Parlement jeunesse du Canada
