= Parlement jeunesse du Québec =

Canadian provincial youth parliament

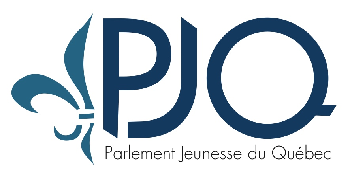
- Formation: 1949
- Legal name: Association québécoise des jeunes parlementaires
- Incorporated: August 16, 1988
- Headquarters: Montreal, Quebec, Canada
- Event Place: Parliament Building (Quebec); Quebec City, Quebec, Canada
- President of AQJP Board of Directors (2017–2018): Lady Africa Sheppard
- Members of the Executive (2017): Gabriel Laurence-Brook; Clarisse Émond-Larochelle; Julien Labrosse; Vincent Lacharité

The Parlement jeunesse du Québec (PJQ) is one of the provincial youth parliaments across Canada. Each year, about a hundred of young participants, aged between 18 and 25, meet up in Quebec to discuss and debate like the real politicians. It aims to reproduce the functioning of the parliament of Quebec, the National Assembly of Quebec. Like the real parliament, the PJQ has its majority party that forms the government, led by the Premier, as well as the official opposition, led by the Leader of Opposition.

While similar in many ways to the National Assembly of Quebec, the PJQ also has many differences that distinguish it from the real parliament. The main one is that there is no vote by party (In the British parliamentary tradition, deputies are required to vote with their party, or else they face expulsion). In other words, deputies from each party are free to vote for what they truly believe, and the Opposition can even agree with the decisions of the Government. This allows more genuine debates and participants have a special opportunity of expressing their ideas without being held back by their party.

The PJQ is organized by the Quebecer Association of the Young Parliament Members inc (Association québécoise des jeunes parlementaires [AQJP]), a non-profit organization that is financed by the participation fees, by governmental subsidies, and by private sponsors.

== Rules of procedures ==
The Parlement jeunesse du Québec aims at reproducing as precisely as possible the proper functioning of the Parliament of Quebec. A fictive party with the majority of the house forms the government and the Premier at its head is facing the leader of the official opposition and his parliamentary group.

== The absence of party discipline ==
The Parlement jeunesse du Québec has nevertheless distinctive elements with regards to the authentic National Assembly. The major one is the absence of party discipline, which enables a member of the governmental party to freely vote against a bill initiated by the executive and presented by a minister of his own party. Likewise, a member of parliament from the opposition can freely support governmental bills. In addition, the ministerial solidarity does not exist.

Those particularities are intended to provide every participant in the simulation with a greater opportunity to express their views on the projects and participate in freer, more inclusive debates.

== Legislative menu ==
For each edition of the parliamentary simulation, four bills are written, presented and defended by their fictive minister. As in the real legislative framework, a shadow minister of the official opposition has the responsibility of passing criticism on the project as well as offering alternative policies. All members of the parliamentary simulation are assigned, based on their preferences, to a commission that will examine more closely one of the four debated pieces of legislation. Members of parliamentary commissions can propose amendments to the bill, in accordance with the governing "principle" of the latter. Accordingly, they have to conduct research on their particular topic and read the provided documentation beforehand to properly fulfill their role. In addition to the four bills presented by the ministers, four members of the opposition have the opportunity to present a motion, consisting in a short proposition of approximately 3 paragraphs addressing a limited and accessible issue and giving way to a 30 minutes debate.

== Language ==
The main language of the simulation is French, as all the written documentation is published in French and most of the interventions are made in French during the debates. However, following the same rule that applies at the National Assembly of Quebec, all participants are free to express their point of view in the idiom of their choice, even though no translation services are provided.

== History ==
=== The 1950s ===
Religion at the core of debates

The QYP held its first session in 1949, under the name “Older Boys’ Parliament of Quebec” (“OBPQ”). It was founded through the assistance of the Rev. Normand Hellier of the United Church. The OBPQ was originally sponsored by the Boys’ Work Board of the Council of Christian Education. The members of the OBPQ were almost all members of Protestant churches – Anglican, Baptist, and Presbyterian. The goal of the simulation was “to captivate the interests of young men and to lead them towards a more profound and sane relation with their Church” (according to a founding document of 1953). Topics where chosen in advance with a religious connotation as in 1954 when the organization of the simulation stated that “Programs should be based on the four-fold theme expressed in Luke 2:52: “And Jesus increased in wisdom and stature, and in favor with God and man”. Establishing the legitimacy of the institution The main goal of the first legislatures is principally for the PJQ to assert itself as a legitimate institution. Consequently, the debates are oriented towards:

- Proper apportionment for electoral ridings
- The election and the repartition of representatives for the diverse confessions
- The importance of non-partisanship
- The budget for the simulation
- The proper means of founding

Furthermore, the OBPQ was an Anglophone organization, conducting its debates and business in English.

=== The 1960s ===
Debates with a social touch

Through the 1960s, the simulation progressively moved away from its origins as church-sponsored boys’ organization and discussed various topics like the following:

- the acknowledgement of birth control as a moral intervention (1954)
- The establishment of stringent security norms for car manufacturers (1965)
- The responsibility of society with regards to people suffering of drug abuses (1967)

The Quiet Revolution perceptibly marked the debates throughout the decade. Here are some examples:

- A bill for the renewing and consolidation of the national identity (1967)
- The restriction of access to English schools (1969)

There is also a liberalization of customs, as can be demonstrated with legislative proposals of 1969:

- A bill aiming at the recognition of the positive effects of sexual relations before marriage and aiming at the legalization of abortion
- A bill aiming at legalizing prostitution

Taking sides

At the same time, the participants demonstrate their awareness to the international crises and conflicts while their debates often denounce particular situations:

- A bill denouncing the Apartheid in South Africa (1965)
- A bill urging the end of the Vietnam War (1965)
- A bill on the rightness and usefulness of furnishing weapons during the Nigerian Civil War (1969)

The advent of women participation

In 1969, the Quebec Older Boys’ Parliament evolve by announcing an important change. By means of resolution, the participants decide that it is about time to include women in their debates. The bill allowing their presence states that “half of the youth of Quebec is not represented at this assembly… and considering that the women have the same rights of men”. It is thereby resolved to change the name of the institution for "Quebec Youth Parliament".

=== The 1970s ===
Following the rhythm of changes

The vibrating aspect of the decade, both in terms of social, economical and political changes, is reflected in the content of the debates. Things change even more in the organization as the “share-selling” financing system principle is eventually abandoned and as a woman is elected as Premier for the first time.

Distancing itself from religion

Still profoundly religious at the beginning of the 1970s, the Quebec Youth Parliament demonstrates, beginning in 1975, increasing autonomy toward the church. A modification to the rules of the institution replaces the term “Christian” with “moral” and the door is opened to other religions while the religious characteristics are retrieved from the proclamations at the end of the decade. The Quebec Youth Parliament even presents a bill that questions the role of the Church in a modern society going as far as to propose that “the church should not try to involve itself with world or community problems and should then direct itself solely towards the spiritual development of man”.

Legislative proposals and front-line debates

This decade was influenced by vanguard legislative propositions like the following:

- Legalizing abortion (1970)
- The acceptance of sexual relations before marriage (1970)
- Endorsement of contraception methods and increased access to them (1970)
- Guaranteed universal access to the nursery services (1970)
- Pay equity for women (1970)
- Control of violent images in the medias (1970)
- Fight of sexism and sexual stereotypes in publicity (1972)
- Proposition for a genetic control of the population (1974)

For the welfare of society

Many bills presented involve social intervention for the welfare of the community. Debates take place around the importance of old-aged people, the fight of pollution, the control of consumption behaviors, labor peace, the rights of offenders or the proper treatment of prisoners. A language at the center of discussions By 1976, the year that the Parti Québécois was first elected to govern Quebec, the QYP was still a largely anglophone organization. However, it introduced bills supporting bilingual teaching and French language integration of new immigrants. In the late 1970s, sponsorship by the Protestant churches declined, contemporaneous with an increase of French-speaking members.

=== The 1980s ===
A French-speaking Parliament

By the 1980s, the QYP became increasingly bilingual as bills were introduced in both English and French and debates occurred in both languages more often. All aspects of the organization are also affected, but the essential characteristics of the simulation, with non-partisanship principles at its core, are preserved. Other interesting fact, the QYP was one of the eight Youth Parliaments that participated in the Youth Parliament of Canada/Parlement jeunesse du Canada ("YPJ Canada") during all of its sessions in Ottawa from 1980 through 1991.

A French-speaking Premier

In 1986, a French-speaking Premier was elected as the head of the QYP for the first time. Within a year, the QYP became a French-speaking organization, with all documentation and legislation produced initially in French, the participants being mostly French-speaking, and the QYP changing its name once again, this time to “le Parlement jeunesse du Québec”.

A look at important debates of the decade

- Regulation and control of the implementation of casinos in Quebec (1983)
- Severe punishment of drunk driving (1984)
- Ban on smoking in indoors public areas (1985)
- Ban on the right to strike for the public sector.

=== The 1990s ===
Ethics: Order of the Day

The legislative menu of the 1990s gives a large place to ethical questions and protection of rights. Modern questions, often related with the evolution of technology, are debated. Here are some examples:

- Surrogate mothers (1990)
- Decriminalization of euthanasia (1992)
- Human reproduction and genetics (1996)

=== The 2000s ===
During this decade the PJQ welcomed French and Israeli delegations. In addition, for the first time since its history of existence, a delegation of Haitians observers was also invited to take part in this political simulation.

A Heritage In Need of Reform

Becoming more conscientiously aware of the mishaps undergone by previous generations, the millennium years are subject to important projects of reform. Notably, there is a desire to rethink society’s make-up, by questioning the current model used since the Quiet Revolution dealing with providence states. This trend is observed in several projects, which aim to redefine how privatization fits into Quebec society. A bill introduced in the year 2000 concerns aspects of private investments in healthcare. Also, 7 years later, a project tackling the question of cost in the health sector set the stage to revise the actual Quebec policies on medication. In 2002, a bill proposed the privatization of water in Quebec. Moreover, current day society has been an important inspirational source for ministers in the millennium years. Hence, traces of the Oka Crisis in 1990 have been recurring popular topics of debate when deliberating on First Nation issues. This topic has been discussed three times in the last decade with bills dealing with governmental autonomy of Aboriginals in 2000, 2005 and 2008. In 2002 and 2009, a bill concentrating on the dubious question of democratic institutions sought to review the current set-up of Quebec’s political system. Furthermore, problems dealing with personal credit and overly-indebtedness were also the main subjects for a bill to be created in 2009, mainly encompassing the usage of high risk credit. The issue of pollution inspired another bill in 2004 aiming to create a market representing pollution rights.

Social Measures: A Forefront Action Plan

Despite the willpower to revise the role of the State, the millennium years paved the way to other important bills that aimed to ameliorate the quality of life for families. The following are some examples:

- Regimes dealing with parental maternity leave and other dispositions for families on the job market needing a leave of absence due to children (2000)
- Better access to the judicial system (2002)
- Normalizing the divorce process (2005)
- Job Security (2007)

=== The 2010s ===
The 61st simulation welcomed the beginning of a new era by dealing with four bills encompassing concrete issues in Quebec society, such as:

- The decriminalization of euthanasia and the legalization of assisted suicide
- Reform on copyright laws
- The decriminalization of prostitution
- Media and Publicity Control

In 2011 (62nd), the bills addressed topics of another nature :

- a reform of the labour code
- the creation of a network of autonomous schools
- the institutionalisation of chronically homeless people
- a change of paradigm regarding international aid

In 2012 (63rd), the bills addressed :

- surrogacy
- a reform of citizenship
- a reform of the agriculture and agri-food system
- a reform of the penal justice system

In 2013 (64th), these four bills were introduced:

- women's representativity on the job market
- the mandatory DNA mapping to prevent severe diseases
- the fight against violence
- the inauguration of an immigration chosen directly by employers

For the first time, a "néo-québécois" Premier was at the head of the PJQ during this 64th legislature.

In 2014 (65th), the youth parliamentarians debated on:

- alcohol from a public health perspective
- children's superior interest
- the collective right to quality information
- revaluation and financing of culture

In 2014, the efforts of past and present executives toward gender parity are recognized, as the "Association québécoise des jeunes parlementaires" receives the "Gouvernance Pluri'elles" award at the Women of merit Gala of the YWCA Quebec. This distinction aims at recognizing the measures put in place by different organizations in order to include more women in their governing entities.

The same year, and for the first time in the whole history of the Quebec Youth Parliament, the entire executive committee was composed of women. The Premier at the time, Anne-Sophie Tommeret-Carrière, was the 7th woman to take on this role in 65 years of the organization's existence.

In 2015 (66th), another precedent is created, as for the first time all members of the presidency of the house and both the Premier and the Leader of the Opposition are women. That year, the assembly debated on controversial and contemporary topics:

- A bill on the management of drinking water resources, aiming at the reduction of water consumption in Quebec for a greater capacity to export water in cases of humanitarian crises.
- A bill on education, focusing on the adaptation of primary and secondary teaching to the needs of pupils and students.
- A bill on the establishing of a sustainable economy, proposing sustainable degrowth through a universal income aimed at reducing the number of worked hours and consumption in the economy.
- A bill on the reform of democratic institutions, allowing citizens to have legislative initiative by means of referendums, without submitting these popular bills to the Charter of rights and freedoms.

In 2016 (67th), a position of leader of the native recruitment - occupied by a member of the first nations - is created, with the purpose of reaching out to native communities across Quebec and create bonds among native and non native youths. There is also a remarkable proportion of participants with immigrant ascendance (27%) and a more than gender equal deputation (53% are women), which represent the diversification and inclusion efforts of the organization. The debated bills addressed :

- The digital rights and freedoms, including the forbidding of any state or private restriction to the freedom of access to internet.
- Rape culture and the judicial treatment of sexual aggression, in particular by putting in place a dialogue procedure and by reversing the burden of proof.
- The modernization of national defence, notably by transforming the armed forces into a civil organization.
- The democratization of social involvement, by instating a mandatory obligation of social involvement hours and by putting in place a monetary indemnification program accordingly.

=== Regional Parliaments ===
During the late 1980s and early 1990s, members of the PJQ and other individuals developed a number of regional parliaments. These are completely independent from the PJQ, but remain in close contact with it. Regional parliaments, in various forms, have been established in Beauce, Montérégie, Outaouais, Mauricie, Estrie, Quebec City, and the area of Laval-Laurentides-Lanaudière, but a limited number of them are currently active.

=== Partnership with the Youth Parliament of the French Community of Belgium ===
Starting in 1994, in collaboration with the Quebec-Wallonia-Brussels Agency for Youth, the PJQ has accepted a number of Belgian delegates as members of the PJQ. This opportunity provided a core of young Belgians with the experience to enable them to establish a Youth Parliament of the French Community of Belgium in 1997. Four members of the PJQ were invited to attend the first session. It has now become a tradition that both Quebecer and Belgium simulations receive a delegation from their counterpart every year as a symbol of that initial partnership.

== See also ==
- Youth Parliament of Canada/Parlement jeunesse du Canada
