= Unicameral Youth Legislature =

The Unicameral Youth Legislature, formerly the Unicameral Youth Conference, is a six-day legislative simulation in Lincoln, Nebraska, United States in which high school students take on the role of lawmakers. Student senators sponsor bills, conduct committee hearings, debate legislation, and discover the unique process of the United States' only unicameral state legislature.

The Unicameral Youth Legislature gives behind-the-scenes access to students who have an interest in public office, government, politics, law, public policy, debate, or public speaking. Students learn about the inner workings of the state legislature directly from senators, staff, and lobbyists. Bill topics are based on legislation considered during the most recent legislative session.

Legislative activities are conducted at the Nebraska State Capitol Building's historic Warner Chamber, which was home to the Nebraska Senate until the state consolidated to a one-house legislature in 1937.

The program is organized by the Nebraska State 4-H Office and the University of Nebraska-Lincoln Extension Office youth development program. The Clerk of the Nebraska Legislature, through the Unicameral Information Office, serves as a technical consultant for the Unicameral Youth Legislature.
