= Western Canada Youth Parliament =

Biennial event

- Predecessor: Youth Parliament of Canada
- Formation: 1983; 43 years ago

The Western Canada Youth Parliament (WCYP) is a biennial event that brings together delegations from the British Columbia Youth Parliament (BCYP), the Alberta Youth Parliament, the Saskatchewan Youth Parliament (SYP) and the Youth Parliament of Manitoba (YPM) for a four-day parliamentary session, usually during the Victoria Day long weekend. The hosting for the WCYP rotates amongst these four youth parliaments. The members at each session of the WCYP debate resolutions in the form of legislation. The rules of parliamentary debate for each WCYP are those of the host province.

== WCYP formation and history ==
The first recorded discussion of holding a western Canadian youth parliament was in 1959. That year, the members of the Alberta Youth Parliament debated but defeated a resolution supporting the creation of a "Western Canada Older Boys' Parliament." It would be over twenty years before the next proposal for a western Canadian youth parliament occurred. In 1981, the Youth Parliament of Manitoba and Northwestern Ontario (as it was then known) organized the first Western Canada Youth Parliament as a project to commemorate their 60th anniversary. It was also designed to be an inter-provincial event to fill the gap between sessions of the now defunct Youth Parliament of Canada/Parlement jeunesse du Canada, which at that time was only held bi-annually. While the British Columbia Youth Parliament did not officially endorse its participation in the first WCYP, representatives of all four western Canadian youth parliaments did attend that first session.

The first Western Canada Youth Parliament in which all four western provincial youth parliaments officially participated was held in the Alberta legislature in 1983.

The success of that WCYP encouraged the constituent parliaments to agree to hold the event bi-annually to alternate with the Youth Parliament of Canada/Parlement jeunesse du Canada. The next session was held in Winnipeg in July 1985. The BCYP hosted in 1987, holding the session in the senate chambers of the University of Victoria. The Saskatchewan Youth Parliament took its turn hosting the May 1989 session in the provincial Legislative Building in Regina. The 1987 session hosted an ambassador from the Junior Statesmen of America from Washington State. The 1989 session was notable in that it was the first time an ambassador attended from one of the eastern Canadian youth parliaments, being a member of the Nova Scotia Youth Parliament.

The rotation of Westerns has since cycled bi-annually between the four provinces in its original sequence, except for the seventh session, which came after a two-year hiatus.

== Proposed expansion ==
In 2021, the British Columbia Youth Parliament announced that the WCYP would be expanding, and would become a national organization known as the "Canada Youth Parliament" ("CYP"). According to the announcement, the CYP was to meet in July 2021 online via Zoom. The CYP was to be an English-language only event, not to be confused with the defunct Youth Parliament of Canada.

== Locations and personages ==
Western Canada Youth Parliament (by Session)
Session	Year	Province	City	Lieutenant Governor	Speaker	Premier
1	1983	AB	Edmonton	?	David Marriott	Thomas Marr
2	1985	MB	Winnipeg	Lloyd Axworthy	?	Erminia Pallone
3	1987	BC	Victoria	Emery Barnes	Robert MacDonald	Geoff Glave
4	1989	SK	Regina	Arnold Tusa	Ken Millard	Scott Quendack
5	1991	AB	Edmonton	?	?	?
6	1993	MB	Winnipeg	Edward Schreyer	David Cantor	Sherri Pierce
7	1996	BC	Burnaby	Gordon Downing	Geoff Glave	Jennifer Jay
8	1998	SK	Regina	Jack Wiebe	Michael Zwaagstra	Tricia Kaminski
9	2000	AB	Edmonton	David Marriott	Dale Harris	Ali Buckingham
10	2002	MB	Winnipeg	Stuart Olmstead	Donna Chanas	Michael Feuerstein
11	2004	BC	Vancouver	Val Anderson	Aniz Alani	Swithin D'Souza
12	2006	SK	Regina	Warren McCall	Matt Leisle	Arielle Zerr
13	2008	AB	Edmonton	Grant Mitchell	Mat Johnson	Maureen Hasinoff
14	2010	MB	Winnipeg	Allen Mills	Dana Gregoire	Darcy Vermeulen
15	2012	BC	Vancouver	Jenn Jay	Gavin Hoekstra	Jenelle Yonkman
16	2014	SK	Regina	Ralph Goodale	Nolan Blackstock	Joseph Chiliak
17	2016	AB	Edmonton	Danielle Larivee	Katie Kelly	Seth Burnard
18	2018	MB	Winnipeg	Dorothy Dobbie	Jennifer Pawluk	Adrienne Tessier
19	2020	BC	Victoria	(Not held due to COVID-19 pandemic)		
