= Canadian Girls in Training =

Religious program

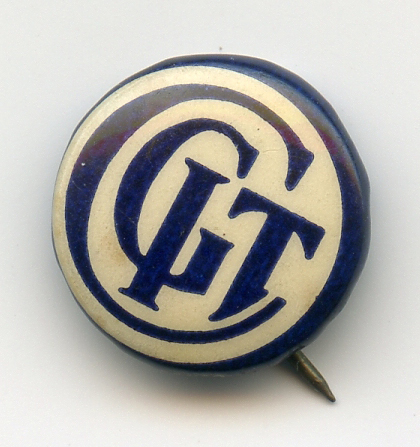

Canadian Girls in Training, or CGIT, is a church-based program for girls and young women aged 11–17 throughout Canada. Girls who join the CGIT vow to "Cherish Health, Seek Truth, Know God, Serve Others and thus, with [Jesus'] help, become the girl God would have me be".

== History ==
The group was founded in 1915, as an alternative to the burgeoning Girl Guides movement, which the founders felt was too British or American and too authoritarian. Initial support was provided by the YWCA, along with the Anglican, Baptist, Presbyterian, and Methodist churches. A uniform to be worn by the members, consisting of a white and blue middy blouse, was modelled on a style of shirt that was popular at that time.

By the end of its first decade, 75,000 girls had received CGIT training. By 1933, there were chapters in 1100 communities across the country, with a total membership of 40,000. Later, after the YWCA ran into financial difficulties, the group was taken over by the Canadian Council of Churches' Department of Christian Education, and was an independent organization by 1976. Today, it is supported by the United Church of Canada, the Presbyterian Church in Canada, and the Canadian Baptist Ministries, and numbers approximately 2,000 members in 150 groups.

== Activities ==
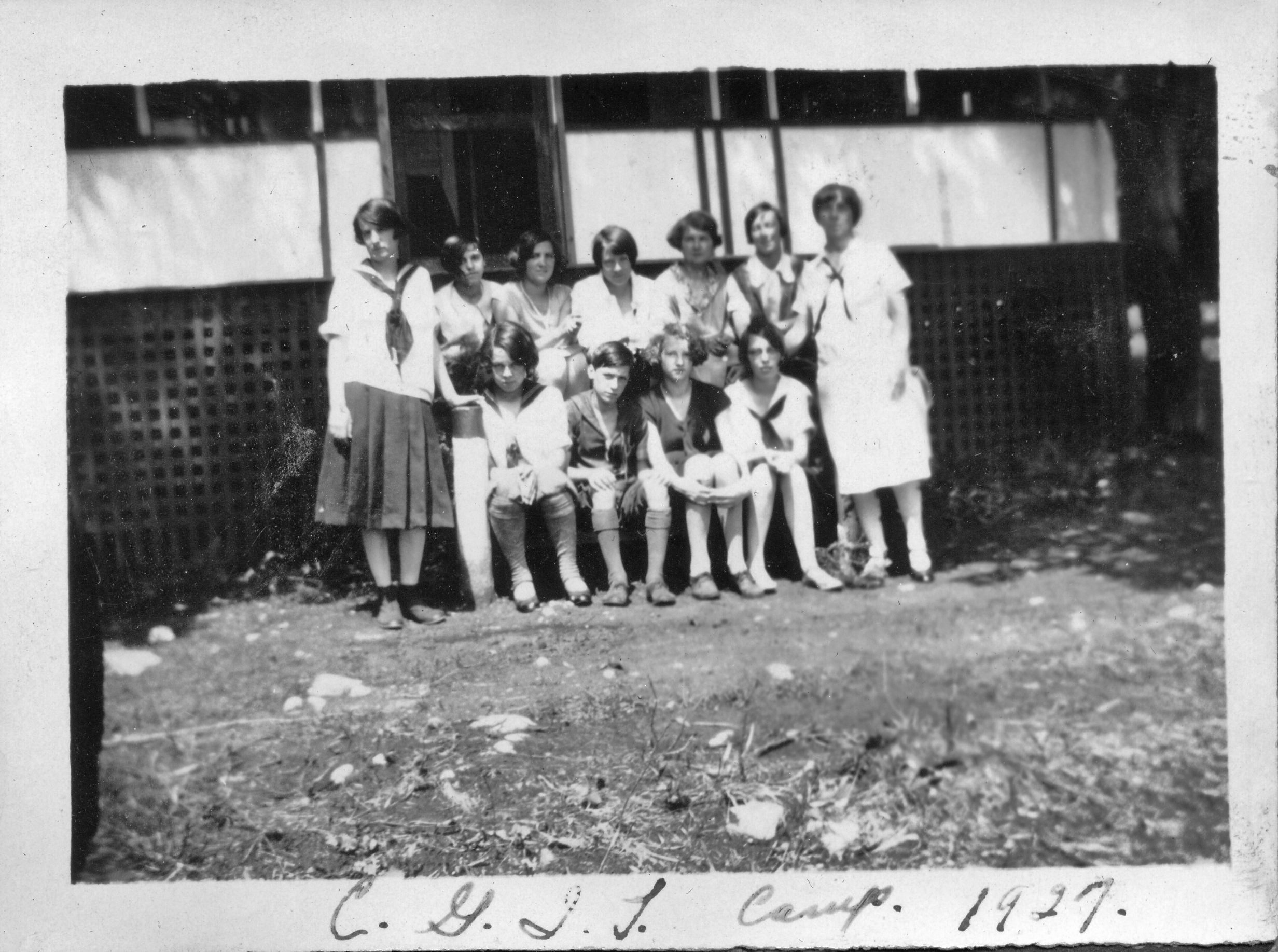
Canadian Girls in Training attending summer camp near Peterborough, Ontario, in 1927.

CGIT leaders organize a variety of creative and athletic activities rooted in or consistent with contemporary Christian (Protestant) values. CGIT members also have the option of attending one of several CGIT camps, including Kalalla (Alcove, Quebec), Ryde Lake (Gravenhurst, Ontario), and Wohelo (near Edmonton, Alberta). The camps provide opportunities for healthy outdoor fun and group activities.

== Archives ==
There is a Canadian Girls in Training fonds at Library and Archives Canada. The archival reference number is R2975, former archival reference number MG28-I313. The fonds covers the date range 1913 to 1985. It consists of 3.83 meters of textual records, 806 photographs and a number of other media records.
