= Alberta Youth Parliament =

- Formation: 1920
- Founder: Taylor Statten
- Headquarters: Edmonton Alberta
- Premier: Daniel Zander
- Leader of the Opposition: Ajminder Sanghotra
- Deputy Premier: Monisha Velmurugan
- Deputy Leader of the Opposition: Sofia Ibrahimi
- Board of directors: TUXIS PARLIAMENTARY ALUMNI SOCIETY OF ALBERTA
- Affiliations: Western Canada Youth Parliament
- Website: www.abyp.ca
- Formerly called: Tuxis Parliament of Alberta

The Alberta Youth Parliament (AYP) is one of a number of provincial model youth parliaments that has its origins in the "boys work" movement of the nineteenth and early twentieth centuries. It is the oldest youth parliament in Alberta, and the longest continuously operating youth parliament in Canada. Its flagship session occurs every December in the Alberta Legislature, and it hosts a variety of smaller events throughout each year. It is open to all youths in Alberta who are between the ages of 15-21.

== Overview ==
The central focus of the organization is its parliamentary program. The main parliamentary session occurs during the last week of December in the Alberta Legislature. Throughout each year, the parliament organizes events such as public speaking and debate, community service, and social events. The cabinet also meets throughout the year to plan events, discuss the operations of the parliament, and prepare for the annual winter session.

The parliament's goals have evolved from the TUXIS "four-fold" program to develop the mental, physical, social and spiritual well-being of its members and all youth. AYP is a non-denominational spiritual youth Parliament which recently reaffirmed its non-exclusionary spiritual foundation. It believes that exposure to different points of view encourages tolerance of varying interpretations of religion, faith, and spirituality.

== Activities ==
AYP holds an annual session from December 26 to 31. The focus of session is the parliamentary sittings where the members learn parliamentary procedure and debate legislation on topics of interest. In addition to the parliamentary procedure and debating activities, members attending the annual session participate in various social action and devotional events.

The parliament hosts smaller events throughout the year that are tailored towards aspects such as public speaking and debate, and community service. It also partakes in a miniature session every May Long Weekend. Every second year, the four western Canadian youth parliaments participate in a joint-mini session which is hosted on a rotating basis. In its off-years, AYP hosts a normal mini-session.

AYP is a founding member of the Western Canada Youth Parliament. It was also a founding member and participant in the now-defunct Youth Parliament of Canada/Parlement jeunesse du Canada.

== Organizational structure ==
The Executive Committee consists of the Premier, the Leader of the Opposition, the Deputy Premier, and the Deputy Leader of the Opposition (formerly known as the Alternate Leader of the Opposition). They are elected at Session by the members of the parliament and serve a one-year term. The Executive Committee is colloquially referred to as the "Front Four" and they run the parliament by appointing the Front Bench: Ministers for the Cabinet and Deputies for the Shadow Cabinet. The current Executive Committee, elected at the 105th Session, is Daniel Zander as Premier, Ajminder Sanghotra as Leader of the Opposition, Monisha Velmurugan as Deputy Premier, and Sofia Ibrahimi as Deputy Leader of the Opposition.

The current Front Bench is:

Cabinet:

- External Affairs: Isaak Nissly, Aayan Saleemi
- Education and Programing, Provincial Secretary: Isaak Nissly
- Internal Affairs, Devotions: Eddie Lutz
- Finance: Ved Agwekar, Ali Abzakh
- Event Coordination: Shree Baskar
- Publicity: Rufine-Tufaine Tompe
- Membership and Recruiting: Addison Kumka
- Minister without Portfolio, vacant

== History ==
The first Session of the Older Boys' Parliament of Alberta was first held in the Legislative Chamber of the Provincial Government in Edmonton, from December 28 to 30, 1920. The Mayor of Edmonton, D.M. Duggan, acted as lieutenant governor. Armour Ford was elected as the first Speaker. The first Premier was Edward Hunter Gowan. The Leader of the Opposition was James Robin Davidson.

Like many of the other Canadian Youth Parliaments, AYP was sponsored by the Boys' Work Board of the provincial Religious Education Council (“REC”). AYP originally met under the name “Alberta Older Boy's Parliament”. The Alberta Older Boy's Parliament added “TUXIS” to its name in 1932. “TUXIS” stands for “Training for Service, with Christ (represented with an 'X' for the Greek letter 'chi') in the center, and you and I on either side, with no-one but Christ between us”. An alternative interpretation is "Training Under Christ In Service."

It was the last of these youth parliaments to retain its “TUXIS” appellation and maintain its Christian character, but has since become a spiritual, but non-denominational organization. The REC was a coalition of religious organizations, the most significant of which was the United Church). The REC of Alberta ceased to exist in 1962. As a result, the TUXIS and Older Boy's Parliament of Alberta Alumni Society was formed. The members of this Society now provide sponsorship, including financial backing and continuity, of TUXIS.

The 60th Session of the Parliament approved a resolution inviting young women to attend the Parliament and share in the companionship of TUXIS. This same year also approved a resolution to change the name from "TUXIS and Older Boys' Parliament of Alberta" to "TUXIS Parliament of Alberta." Young women first attended the 62nd Session in 1981 at Red Deer and soon entered into the leadership when LaVonne Rosvick was elected Premier for the 67th Session.

The parliament celebrated its 100th Session in 2019, and its 100th anniversary in 2020; the latter Session was conducted virtually due to the COVID-19 pandemic. Unlike most other Canadian Youth Parliaments founded during the same time, AYP met continuously throughout the Great Depression and World War II. As a result, AYP has the longest uninterrupted history of annual sessions of any youth parliament in Canada. The TUXIS Parliament of Alberta voted to change its operating name to the Alberta Youth Parliament during its 102nd Session in December 2022, and the change was ratified by the Alumni Council on March 20, 2022.

== Notable alumni ==
- Clarence Campbell (Former NHL commissioner)
- Robert Clark (Former Alberta MLA)
- Gary Dickson (Former Alberta MLA)
- Bob Hawkesworth (Former Alberta MLA)
- David King (Former Alberta MLA and Cabinet Minister)
- Danielle Larivee (Former Alberta MLA and Cabinet Minister)
- Murray Smith (Former Alberta MLA and Cabinet Minister)
- Richard Starke (Former Alberta MLA and Former Cabinet Minister)

== See also ==
- Youth Parliament of Canada/Parlement jeunesse du Canada
- History of Youth Work
