= TUXIS =

TUXIS was a boys' program similar to the Scouting movement promoted by Canadian Protestant churches. There are a number of variations of what the acronym TUXIS is said to stand for. Most commonly, it is said to stand for "U ('you') and I in Training and Service with Christ ('X'; the first letter of Christ in Greek) in the centre". Another similar meaning was Training Under Christ In Service.

== History ==
During the late 19th and early 20th centuries, a "boys' work" movement developed in response to the need for activities for young men who worked by day but were idle by night. The YMCA was one of a number of organizations that developed various programs in response. These programs usually incorporated the YMCA philosophy based upon the "fourfold" development of the physical, mental, spiritual and social well-being of the person, based upon Luke 2:52: "And Jesus grew in wisdom and stature, and in favor with God and men." These programs met with varied success.

One of the strongest proponents of boys' work programmes within the YMCA was Taylor Statten, a Second Boer War veteran. In 1912, Statten became the Boys' Work Secretary on the national YMCA executive. Borrowing from both Canadian and American YMCA programs, and aspects of the Boy Scouts, Statten established the Canadian Standards Efficiency Training (CSET) program, a system of graded tests where boys passed from one level to the next. These standards were borrowed from the "fourfold" philosophy.

Under the CSET program, TUXIS was established for boys aged 15 to 17. A similar program called Trail Rangers was developed for boys aged 12 to 14. A parallel program was established for girls, called the Canadian Girls in Training (CGIT). The TUXIS program included midweek activities of Sunday school classes, outdoor activities, and community service. Camping was a significant activity and component of the TUXIS program.

Soon after its creation, the YMCA joined with a number of Protestant churches to establish the National Boys' Work Board. However, the YMCA decided to focus on its other programs, and the National Boys' Work Board came under the control of the Religious Education Council of Canada (REC). The United Church of Canada came to dominate the Boys' Work Board and the TUXIS program. J. Howard Crocker was a liaison between TUXIS and the YMCA in Canada via the Boys' Work Board.

The TUXIS movement enjoyed success in the 1920s and 1930s. In the early 1920s, the TUXIS movement brought about the establishment of a number of Canadian Youth Parliaments. The onset of World War II stifled the organization and development of TUXIS. By the end of the war, the TUXIS movement had diminished, and the National Boys' Work Board was in a weak state of affairs. The program went into decline in the post-war years. By the 1970s, the TUXIS movement was essentially finished. The CGIT program continues to operate in nearly all provinces. The word TUXIS survives as a vestigial part of the name of the TUXIS Parliament of Alberta.

== See also ==
- History of Youth Work

== Sources ==
- Committee on Canadian Standard Efficiency Training of the National Council of the YMCA. The C.S.E.T. Manual for TUXIS Boys including the Canadian Standard Efficiency Training Program. YMCA. Toronto, 1918.
- Edwards, Charles A. M. Taylor Statten: A Biography. Ryerson Press, 1960.
