= Model parliament =

Parliamentary simulation

A model parliament, also known as a mock parliament, is a system that simulates the parliamentary proceedings of a legislature or deliberative assembly. It typically follows the Westminster parliamentary system.

== Background ==
Model parliaments are usually used as educational tools. They allow students and participants to experience the processes of debate, deliberation, and lawmaking typical of real parliaments and legislatures.

Model parliaments are often based on the rules and procedures of an existing national or subnational legislature. For example, they may mirror the Parliament of Canada or the United States Congress. This focus on replicating real bodies promotes understanding of how different governments function.

However, model parliaments also serve other purposes beyond pure imitation. Some aim to advocate social or political causes. The Canadian youth parliament movement was founded to advance youth programs across Canada through mock sessions. In Australia, the YMCA run Youth Parliament programs in each state and territory as part of their community outreach.

International organisations also utilise model parliaments for advocacy. Oxfam sponsors an annual "International Youth Parliament" to encourage youth-led social reform worldwide. Participants in this model UN-style event debate issues and propose solutions on topics like poverty, human rights, and sustainability.

Model parliaments have also been used for political protest. In 1914, the women's suffrage movement in Canada organised a parody session of the Manitoba legislature to call attention to the government's refusal to extend the right to vote to women. Led by activist Nellie McClung, this mock parliament helped spark national debate on women's suffrage issues.

== Training and Reform ==
In A Model Parliament for Canada (2011), Preston Manning proposes a permanent model parliament to train future legislators and test parliamentary reforms. The institution would simulate the Canadian parliamentary system, allowing participants to practice debates, committee work, and lawmaking. Manning argues that such training could better prepare elected officials for the practical work of governance and provide a safe environment to experiment with procedural innovations.

== See also ==
- Activism
- YMCA Youth Parliament
- Commonwealth Youth Parliament
- European Youth Parliament
- UK Youth Parliament
- Model House of Commons (UK)
