= List of youth organizations =

The following is a list of youth organizations. A youth organization is a type of organization with a focus upon providing activities and socialization for minors. In this list, organizations are international unless noted otherwise.

== 0–9 ==
- 4-H (Worldwide)

== A ==
- AEGEE (Europe)
- AIESEC
- Air Training Corps (UK)
- A.J.E.F (LatAm)
- All India Youth Federation - AIYF (India)
- Akbayan Youth (Philippines)
- Akhil Bharatiya Vidyarthi Parishad (India)
- Aleph Zadik Aleph
- American Youth Congress (US)
- American Youth Hostels (US)
- Amigos de las Americas
- Anjuman Talaba-e-Islam (Pakistan)
- Armenian National Students Association
- Armenian Youth Federation
- Army Cadet Force (UK)
- Arran (CAT)
- Arsalyn Program (US)
- Article 12 (England)
- Ateitis (Lithuania)
- All Assam Students Union (Assam, India)
- All India Muslim Students Federation (India)
- All-Polish Youth (Poland)
- Associazione Guide e Scout Cattolici Italiani (IT)

== B ==
- Bangladesh-China Youth Student Association
- Bangladesh Chhatra Maitri (Bangladesh)
- Bangladesh Ganatantrik Chhatra Sangsad (Bangladesh)
- Bangladesh Jatiotabadi Jubo Dal (Bangladesh)
- Bangladesh Islami Chhatra Shibir (Bangladesh)
- Bangladesh Youth Union (Bangladesh)
- Bangladesh Jubo Mohila League (Bangladesh)
- Bangladesh Islami Chhatri Sangstha (Bangladesh)
- BBYO
- Betar
- Bharat Scouts and Guides (India)
- Bharatiya Janata Yuva Morcha (India)
- Big Brothers Big Sisters of America (US)
- Bnei Akiva
- Boys' Brigade
- Boy Scouts of America (US)
- Boy Scouts of the Philippines (Philippines)
- The Boys & Girls Aid Society (US)
- Boys and Girls Clubs of America (US)
- Boys & Girls Clubs of Canada (Canada)
- British Columbia Youth Parliament (Canada)
- BUNDjugend (Germany)
- Bus Project (US)

== C ==
- Chhatra Jamiat Bangladesh (Bangladesh)
- Chhatra League (Bangladesh)
- Canadian Cadet Organizations (Canada)
- Camp Fire (US)
- Campus Front of India (India)
- Canadian Young Judaea (Canada)
- Canadian Youth Congress (Canada)
- Centre for the Talented Youth of Ireland (Ireland)
- Children and Youth International (Europe)
- Children of the American Colonists (US)
- Children of the American Revolution (US)
- Children of the Confederacy (US)
- China Youth Corps (Taiwan)
- Chiro (Belgium, Philippines)
- Christian Democratic Youth Appeal (Netherlands)
- Christian Democratic Youth League (Sweden) (Sweden)
- Christian Service Brigade (US/Canada)
- Church Lads' and Church Girls' Brigade
- CISV International
- City Year (US)
- Civil Air Patrol (US)
- CJD (Germany)
- Climate Cardinals
- Communist Youth of Austria
- Communist Youth Marxist–Leninists (Denmark)
- Communist Youth Movement (Netherlands)
- Company of Young Canadians Historical
- Confédération Européenne de Scoutisme (Europe)
- Congress of South African Students
- Coptic Orphans (Egypt)
- CrossRoads Ministry (US)
- CVJM (Germany)

== D ==
- DeMolay International
- Democratic Youth Federation of India
- DECA formerly known as Distributive Education Clubs of America
- Duterte Youth
- Dream for America (US)

== E ==
- Eurodesk (Europe)
- Electrical Engineering Students' European Association (Europe)
- Eucharistic Youth Movement
- European Confederation of Young Entrepreneurs (Europe)
- Erasmus Student Network (Europe)
- European Free Alliance Youth (Europe)
- European Geology Students Network
- European Geography Association
- European Horizons (US)
- The European Law Students' Association (Europe)
- European Naturist Youth (Europe)
- European Scout Federation (British Association) (UK)
- European Students of Industrial Engineering and Management (Europe)
- European Youth Forum (Europe)
- European Youth Parliament (Europe)
- Euzko Gaztedi (Spain/Europe)
- Emirates Foundation (UAE)

== F ==
- Federal Association of Liberal Students Groups (Germany)
- FBLA (US)
- FFA (Future Farmers of America) (US)
- Finns Party Youth (Finland) (2006-2020)
- Fimcap (Global)
- First Priority (US)
- The First Tee (US)
- The Foundation for Young Australians (FYA)
- For Inspiration and Recognition of Science and Technology (FIRST) (Global)
- Foras na Gaeilge (Ireland)
- Foróige (Ireland)
- Friends of Nature (Global)
- FZY (UK)

== G ==
- German Federal Association of Young Entrepreneurs (Germany)
- German Scout Movement (Germany)
- German Foundation for World Population (Deutsche Stiftung Weltbevoelkerung, DSW) (Germany)
- German Youth Movement (Germany)
- Girlguiding (UK)
- Gerakan Pemuda Ansor (Indonesia)
- Girls' Brigade
- Girls Inc. (US)
- Girl Scouts of the USA
- Girl Guides of Canada
- Girl Scouts of the Philippines
- Global Vision (Canada)
- Global Youth Action Network
- Great Japan Youth Party
- Green Youth (Germany)
- Gopali Youth Welfare Society (India)

== H ==
- Habonim Dror
- Habonim Dror Australia
- Hitler Youth (Nazi Germany)
- HaNoar HaOved VeHaLomed (Israel)
- Hanoar Hatzioni
- Hakfar Hayarok (Israel)
- Hashomer Hatzair
- Hebrew Scouts Movement in Israel
- High School Democrats of America (United States)
- Hineni (Australia)
- Hip Hop 4 Life (US)
- HOSA-Future Health Professionals (US)
- Ho Chi Minh Communist Youth Union (Vietnam)
- Hugh O'Brian Youth Leadership Foundation

== I ==
- IAESTE
- Islami Jamiat-e-Talaba (Pakistan)
- Islami Chhatra Andolan Bangladesh (Bangladesh)
- Improved Order of Red Men (US)
- IIMUN
- Indian Catholic Youth Movement (India)
- Interact
- International Federation of Medical Students' Associations
- International Islamic Federation of Student Organizations
- Indian Youth Congress (India)
- International Young Democrat Union
- International Lesbian, Gay, Bisexual, Transgender and Queer Youth and Student Organisation
- International Order of the Rainbow for Girls
- International Pharmaceutical Students' Federation
- International Student/Young Pugwash
- International Federation of Liberal Youth
- International Union of Socialist Youth
- International Youth Rights
- International Youth Change Maker
- Israel Gay Youth
- Italian Youth of the Lictor (Fascist Italy)

== J ==
- Junior Reserve Officer Training Corps (US)
- JCNetwork (Germany)
- Jonge Democraten (Netherlands)
- Jesus Freaks
- Jesus Youth (India)
- Jewish Lads' and Girls' Brigade (UK)
- Job's Daughters International (Worldwide)
- Jubo League (Bangladesh)
- Jatiyo Chhatra Samaj (Bangladesh)
- Jatiyo Jubo Sanghoti (Bangladesh)
- Jatiyo Jubo Mohila Party (Bangladesh)
- Junge Generation (Austria)
- Junge Liberale (Germany)
- Junge Piraten (Germany)
- Junge Union (Germany)
- Junior firefighter (Global)
- Junior Forest Wardens (Canada)
- Young Socialists (Netherlands)
- Junior Achievement (US)
- Junior Chamber International
- Junior Optimist Octagon International
- Junior State of America (US)
- Jusos (Germany)

== K ==
- Kabataan (Philippines) (lit. youth)
- Key Club
- Kids for Peace
- Kids Helping Kids
- Kids Off The Block

== L ==
- La Forja (CAT)
- Left Youth Solid (Germany)
- League of Filipino Students (Philippines)
- Liberal Youth of Sweden (Sweden)
- Leo clubs
- Los Angeles Maritime Institute (US)
- Little League Baseball

== M ==
- Motivate Canada (Canada)
- Make A Difference (India)
- Muslim Student Union of the University of California, Irvine (US)
- Muslim Students Society of Nigeria
- Muslim Students Federation (I. U. M. L.) (India)
- Muslim Students Federation (Kerala unit) (India)
- Muslim Students Association of South Africa (South Africa)
- Muslim Students' Association (Indonesia) (Indonesia)
- Muslim Students Association (US/CANADA)
- Mocidade Portuguesa (Portugal)

== N ==
- National Cadet Corps India
- National Cadet Corps (Singapore)
- National Civil Defence Cadet Corps (Singapore)
- National Commission on Resources for Youth
- National Council For Voluntary Youth Services (UK)
- National Federation of Young Farmers' Clubs (UK)
- National FFA Organization (US)
- National Junior Classical League (US)
- National Police Cadet Corps (Singapore)
- National Students Union of India (NSUI)
- National Youth Administration
- National Youth Council of Armenia
- National Youth Council of Nigeria (Nigeria)
- National Youth Leadership Council (US)
- National Youth Organisation (disambiguation) (several)
- National Youth Rights Association (US)
- NCSY
- Netzer Olami
- The Newsboys Strike Historical
- Nexus Global Youth Summit
- Noam
- North American Federation of Temple Youth (US)
- Northern Ireland Youth Forum (United Kingdom)
- Not Back to School Camp (US)

== O ==
Members of the Opera Nazionale Balilla, a Fascist youth organization in Italy, early 1930s

- Oaktree (foundation) (Australia)
- Opera Nazionale Balilla (Fascist Italy)
- Ógra Fianna Fáil (Ireland)
- Ógra Shinn Féin (Ireland)
- One World Youth Project
- oikos International
- Ontario Youth Parliament (Canada)
- Order of the Arrow (US)
- Organisational Forum of Economical Congress OFW (Germany)
- Our Time (US)
- Our Youth Social Community (India)

== P ==
- Parlement Jeunesse du Québec (Canada)
- Pathfinders (Seventh-day Adventist)
- PDMU (Mexico)
- Peacefire (US)
- PerspectieF (Netherlands)
- PETO (Germany)
- PINK! (Netherlands)
- Pioneer Movement (Communist countries)
- Plant-for-the-Planet
- Polish YMCA (Poland)
- Pony Club
- Privrednik Junior (Croatia)
- Progressive Youth Federation of India
- Project Q (Milwaukee)
- Puerto Rico Statehood Students Association (US)

== R ==
- Rajiv Gandhi National Institute of Youth Development (India)
- International Order of the Rainbow for Girls (Worldwide)
- Raleigh International (UK)
- Rawhide Boys Ranch (US)
- The Rebelution (US)
- Red Cross Youth (Singapore)
- Red Youth Guards (North Korea)
- Resistance (YBNP) (UK)
- Revolutionary Youth Association (India)
- Revolutionary Youth Union (Syria)
- Republican Youth of Catalonia (Catalan Countries)
- RISKA – Remaja Islam Sunda Kelapa (Indonesia)
- Rock and Roll Camp for Girls (US)
- ROOD (Netherlands)
- Roosevelt Institution (US)
- Rotaract
- Royal Canadian Air Cadets (Canada)
- Royal Canadian Army Cadets (Canada)
- Royal Canadian Sea Cadets (Canada)
- Royal Rangers
- RSY-Netzer (UK)
- Russian Social-Democratic Union of Youth (Russia)

== S ==
- Sangguniang Kabataan (Philippines)
- Sandinista Youth (Nicaragua)
- Sano Sansar Initiative (Nepal)
- Saskatchewan Youth Parliament (Canada)
- School Strike for Climate (global)
- Scottish Youth Parliament (United Kingdom)
- Scouting
  - Boy Scouts
  - Brownie (Girl Guides)
  - Cub Scouts
  - Explorer Scouts
  - Girl Guiding and Girl Scouting
  - Navigators (US and UK)
  - Rover Scouts
  - Venture Scouts
- SDLP Youth (NI)
- Secular Student Alliance (US)
- Serb Democratic Forum-Youth Forum (Croatia)
- SGPJ (Netherlands)
- Sweden Democratic Youth (Sweden) (1993-2015)
- Socialist Youth (disambiguation) (several)
- Socialist Youth Front (Denmark)
- Socialist Youth of Germany – Falcons (Germany)
- Solidarity Youth Movement, Kerala (India)
- Sotsyalistishe Kinder Farband (SKIF) (Australia)
- South African Students Congress
- Samahan ng Progresibong Kabataan (Philippines)
- SPIC MACAY
- SpiralScouts (US)
- St John Ambulance Australia Cadets (Australia)
- St John Ambulance Cadets in the UK (UK)
- St John Youth New Zealand
- Street Kids International (Canada/US)
- Strong Women Strong Girls (US)
- Student Catholic Action (Philippines)
- Student Union of Latvia
- Students' Union of Obafemi Awolowo University
- Students' Union of Rajiv Gandhi Government Polytechnic (SURGGP), Itanagar
- Student Edge
- Students Union of Bhutan
- Students Union of Namibia
- Studentenverbindung (Germany)
- Students' Union (Turkey)
- Students' Union UCL (formerly University College London Union)
- Students for a Free Tibet
- Student Union of the University of Helsinki
- Student Union of Tampere University (Finland)
- Student Union in Sundsvall (Sweden)
- Student Nonviolent Coordinating Committee
- Student Pugwash USA (US)
- Students for a Democratic Society (1960 organization) (US)
- Student Union (Valdosta State University) (US)
- Student Union AKKU (Netherlands)
- Students For Liberty (US-based International organization)
- Students for a Democratic Society (2006 organization) (US)
- Students' Federation of India (India)
- Students Islamic Organisation of India (India)
- Students for Sensible Drug Policy (US)
- SustainUS (US)
- Sharp Greens (Poland)

== T ==
- Taking Children Seriously (UK)
- TakingITGlobal
- Teenage Republicans (US)
- Teen Mania Ministries (US)
- Teen Talking Circles
- The Second Mile (US)
- The Trevor Project (US)
- The Youth Cafe (Kenya, Africa)
- Trips for Kids (US, Canada, Israel)
- TUXIS Parliament of Alberta (Canada)
- Tzivos Hashem

== U ==
- UK Youth Climate Coalition (UK)
- UK Youth Parliament (UK)
- United Synagogue Youth
- Up with People (US)
- Urban Saints (UK)
- UthMag (United Arab Emirates)
- Urdd Gobaith Cymru (Wales)

== V ==
- Ver.di Jugend
- Vietnamese Scout Association
- Voortrekkers (youth organisation) (South Africa)

== W ==
* WE Charity (Kenya, Sri Lanka, India, Ecuador, Sierra Leone, China)
- Welsh Youth Parliament (United Kingdom)
- Wesley Guild (Ghana, South Africa, Botswana, Namibia, United Kingdom, Nigeria, Sierra Leone, Swaziland and Lesotho)
- Wilderness Inner-City Leadership Development (US)
- Winds Across the Bay (US)
- The Woodcraft Folk (UK)
- World Assembly of Youth
- World Assembly of Muslim Youth
- World Association of Young Scientists
- World Association of Girl Guides and Girl Scouts
- World Esperanto Youth Organization
- World Federation of Democratic Youth
- World Organisation of Students and Youth
- World Organization of the Scout Movement
- World Scout Committee

== Y ==
Russian youth participating in the state-sponsored Young Army Cadets National Movement in Kursk, 2019

- YERID
- Young Australia League (AUS)
- Young Army Cadets National Movement (Russia)
- Youth Parliament (BAN)
- Young Americans for Freedom (US)
- Young BNP (UK)
- Youth Bank (international)
- Young Communists (Giovani Comunisti/e) (Italy)
- Young Communist League USA (US)
- Young Conservatives (UK)
- Young Democratic Socialists of America (US)
- Young Democrats (Giovani Democratici) (Italy)
- Young Democrats of America (US)
- Young European Federalists (Europe)
- Young European Leadership (Europe)
- Young Judaea
- Young Left (Austria)
- Young Life (US)
- Young Marines (US)
- Young People's Socialist League (1907) (US)
- Young People's Socialist League (Socialist Party USA) (US)
- Young Religious Unitarian Universalists (US/Canada)
- Young Riflemen (Lithuania)
- Young Yatri Organization (Nepal)
- Youth 2000
- Youth Action Network (UK)
- Youth Activism Project (US)
- Youth Assisting Youth (US)
- Youth Association of Kuwait (Kuwait)
- Youth for Christ (US)
- Youth Climate Movement (US)
- Youth Conservation Corps (US)
- Youth for Human Rights International
- Young Labour (UK)
- Youth Leaders International
- Youth Liberation of Ann Arbor
- Youth Link Movement (Sri Lanka)
- Youth Organisation Freedom and Democracy (Netherlands)
- Youth Parliament of Manitoba (Canada)
- Youth Parliament Program (India)
- Youth Parliament of Pakistan (Pakistan)
- Youth Radio (US)
- AER Youth Regional Network (Europe)
- Young Republicans (US)
- Young Scientists of Australia (AUS)
- Youth Service America
- Youth United (India)
- Yuva Unstoppable (India)
- YMCA (Young Men's Christian Association)
- YWCA (Young Women's Christian Association)
- YMCA Youth and Government (US)
- YMCA Youth Parliament (AUS)

== See also ==
- List of youth empowerment organizations
- List of youth topics
- Youth-led media
- Youth empowerment
- Youth wing
- Youth services
