= Eugen (disambiguation) =

Eugen is a masculine given name. It may also refer to:

- Christoph Eugen (born 1976), Austrian Nordic combined skier
- Eugen Systems, a French video game developer
- European Geology Students Network (EUGEN), a German youth organization

== See also ==
- German cruiser Prinz Eugen, German World War II heavy cruiser
- SMS Prinz Eugen, Austrian and Austro-Hungarian Navy ships
