= Remaja =

Remaja may refer to:

- Kadet Remaja Sekolah Malaysia, scout-like movement organized by the Government of Malaysia as a youth organisation
- Komik Remaja, Malaysian manga magazine with manga and occasionally manhwa translated into Bahasa Malaysia
- Remaja Islam Sunda Kelapa, Islamic youth organization located in Jakarta, Indonesia
- Remaja (magazine), Malaysian teen magazine
