= Prince Eugene =

Prince Eugene most commonly refers to:

- Prince Eugene of Savoy (1663–1736), field marshal in the army of the Holy Roman Empire and of the Austrian Habsburg dynasty

Prince Eugene may also refer to:

== People ==
- Prince Eugenio, Duke of Genoa (1906–1996)
- Prince Eugen, Duke of Närke (1865–1947), Swedish painter, art collector and patron of artists
- Prince Eugen of Bavaria (1925–1997)
- Prince Eugène de Ligne (1893–1960)
- Prince Eugene of Saxe-Hildburghausen (1730–1795)
- Prince Eugen of Schaumburg-Lippe (1899–1929)
- Eugène de Beauharnais (1781–1824), French general and statesman
- Prince Eugenio Emanuele, Count of Villafranca (1816–1888)

== Warships ==
- SMS Prinz Eugen, several Austro-Hungarian warships
- German cruiser Prinz Eugen (later USS Prinz Eugen), a World War II heavy cruiser
- HMS Prince Eugene (1915), a British World War I monitor
- Italian cruiser Eugenio di Savoia, a World War II light cruiser

== Other uses ==
- 7th SS Volunteer Mountain Division Prinz Eugen, a division of the German Waffen-SS
- Prinz Eugen (train), an express train connecting Austria and Germany
- Prinz Eugen, a 1960 biography by Alexander Lernet-Holenia
- Prinz Eugen, der edle Ritter, a folksong
