= Youth Action Network =

UK-wide youth organisation that promotes volunteering

The Youth Action Network (formerly the National Federation of Youth Action Agencies) was a UK-wide youth organisation that promotes volunteering by young people in their communities.

The organisation was set up in 1989 under the name World Affairs Canada as a support network for Youth Action Agencies across the country, it later changed name to Youth Action Network in 1995. It was supported itself by the National Youth Agency, though this support ceased with the launch of Millennium Volunteers in 1999.

One of the chief successes of the organisation has been the development of a quality assurance model, based on PQASSO, for its members.

It merged into NCVYS on 9 March 2012

Youth Action Network members include:

- Aylesbury Youth Action (founder member)
- Youth Action Cambridge (founder member)
- Solent Youth Action
- The Ivy Project

Youth Action Network currently has around 100 member organisations which pay an annual fee to be a member of the network.

May also stand for young adult novel, in certain circumstances, including and not limited to fanfictions. These fanfictions often refer to movies in the late 20th century.
