= OFW =

OFW may stand for:

- Oberfeldwebel
- Open Firmware
- Organisationsforum Wirtschaftskongress
- Overseas Filipino Worker
- Overseas foreign worker
- Oxy–fuel welding
