= Jatiyo Sechhasebak Party =

Volunteer wing of Jatiya Party (Ershad)

Jatiyo Swechchhasebak Party
- জাতীয় স্বেচ্ছাসেবক পার্টি
- Formation: May 6, 1983; 42 years ago
- Location: Bangladesh
- Affiliations: Jatiyo Party (Ershad)

Jatiyo Sechhasebak Party (Bengali: জাতীয় স্বেচ্ছাসেবক পার্টি, lit. 'National Volunteer Party') is the volunteer wing of Jatiya Party (Ershad).

== History ==
On 6 May 1983, Chief Martial Law Administrator Hussain Muhammad Ershad established this organization in the name of Bangladeshi nationalism, democracy, voluntary work, economic liberation and Islamic values.

In May 2014, a 161-member convening committee of Sechhasebak Party was formed.

In August 2020, JP approved the formation of a 165-member central executive committee of the Jatiyo Sechhasebak Party with Liaquat Hossain Khoka as its president and Md. Belal Hossain as general secretary.

In April 2024, a new convening committee of Sechhasebak Party was approved.
