= Project Q =

Logo

Project Q is the youth program of the Milwaukee LGBT Community Center serving lesbian, gay, bisexual, transgender, questioning, and straight allied young adults ages 24 and under. Established in 1999, Project Q (PQ) has grown to one of the largest programs at the Milwaukee LGBTQ Community Center.

PQ has three drop-in days, a day for small groups, and a day for "population specific" groups: ladies lounge, Inside Out, and FOCUS. Through its programming, activities, groups and events, Project Q provides a space for lesbian, gay, bisexual, transgender and questioning youth and their straight allies.

== History ==
Project Q was founded in 1999 by Kurt Dyer, Justin Lockridge and a group of friends. It began in the living room of their apartment which was North of the Milwaukee LGBT Community Center's former 315 W. Court St. location. Kurt Dyer served as Project Q's first staff person, leaving as Director of Youth Services in 2007.

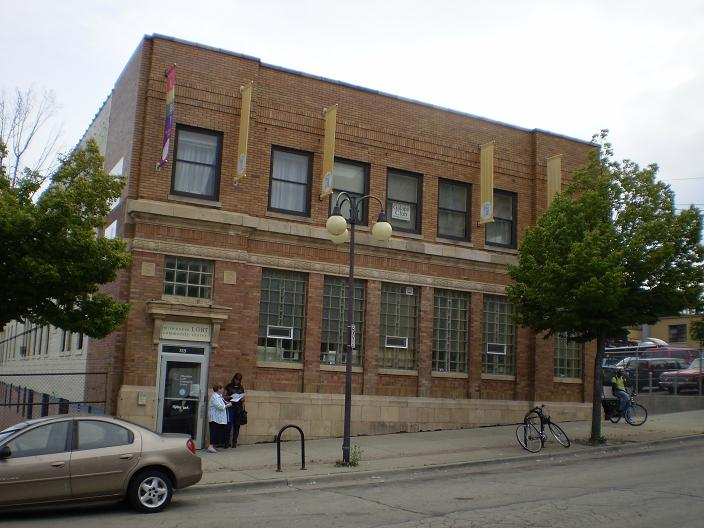
The Milwaukee LGBT Community building

== Groups ==
Project Q offers a variety of groups for young adults (24 & under) on health & wellness, identity, discussion, skills building, social outlets, sexual health awareness/education, safety, and life skill development in order to empower young adults to make healthy decisions and to become healthy adults.

=== Ladies Lounge ===
Ladies Lounge is a group for female-identified individuals.

=== FOCUS ===
Focus is a group for male-identified individuals.

== See also ==
- List of LGBT community centers
- List of LGBT-related organizations
- List of youth organizations
