= Coptic Orphans =

Non-profit organization based in Virginia, US

- Abbreviation: CO
- Formation: 1988; 38 years ago
- Founder: Nermien Riad
- Type: nonprofit
- Headquarters: Fairfax, Virginia, United States
- Region served: Egypt
- Website: https://copticorphans.org/

Coptic Orphans Support Association, better known as Coptic Orphans (CO) is an international development organization that has transformed the lives of over 86,000 children in Egypt since 1988. Its mission is to break the cycle of poverty through long-term programs that focus on education.

Coptic Orphans operates in the United States, Canada, Australia, the United Kingdom, and Egypt.

== History ==
Coptic Orphans began in 1988 when Nermien Riad, a Coptic American then working in Egypt, witnessed the abject poverty of a Cairo orphanage.

“Like many Copts, my parents had left Egypt for the United States in search of a better life,” Riad said. “So when I witnessed the crippling poverty these innocent children were enduring, I felt an immediate and overpowering need to do something. I could not just walk away.”

When Riad returned to the U.S., she gathered together a group of relatives and friends to support 45 children in the orphanage. She soon realized that many children in Egypt’s orphanages still had a mother, but were forced into institutions by the loss of the father, the traditional breadwinner in Egyptian society. Riad decided to dedicate her organization, the first of its kind in the Coptic world, to keeping children out of such institutions by supporting widowed mothers, while at the same time working with the children to ensure they have the finest education possible. This formed the core structure of Coptic Orphans' flagship program, which would later become known as Not Alone.

Coptic Orphans incorporated as a U.S. 501(c)(3) nonprofit in 1992.

== Programs ==
=== Not Alone ===
Many fatherless children in Egypt are forced into institutions when the loss of the father throws their family into poverty. Children in these institution face myriad problems even into adulthood, and because of it they often fall through the cracks of Egyptian society.

Coptic Orphans’ flagship Not Alone Program changes the lives of orphaned Coptic children by supporting the children and their remaining relatives in order to keep families together and children out of institutions. The program makes it possible for these children to stay in school, lift themselves out of poverty, and succeed in life.

Children enrolled in Not Alone are more likely to complete their secondary education than their peers. The program develops the whole child, including character, physical and mental health, as well as a service-minded orientation by nurturing the child’s spirit.

The backbone of the program is the network of nearly 1,000 volunteers who work in more than 850 towns and villages across Egypt. These volunteers foster a loving, supportive bond with each fatherless child, allowing the young boy or girl to regain dignity and begin on the path to a brighter future. The volunteers are also specially trained to improve all facets of the child’s education and living conditions.

=== The Valuable Girl Project ===
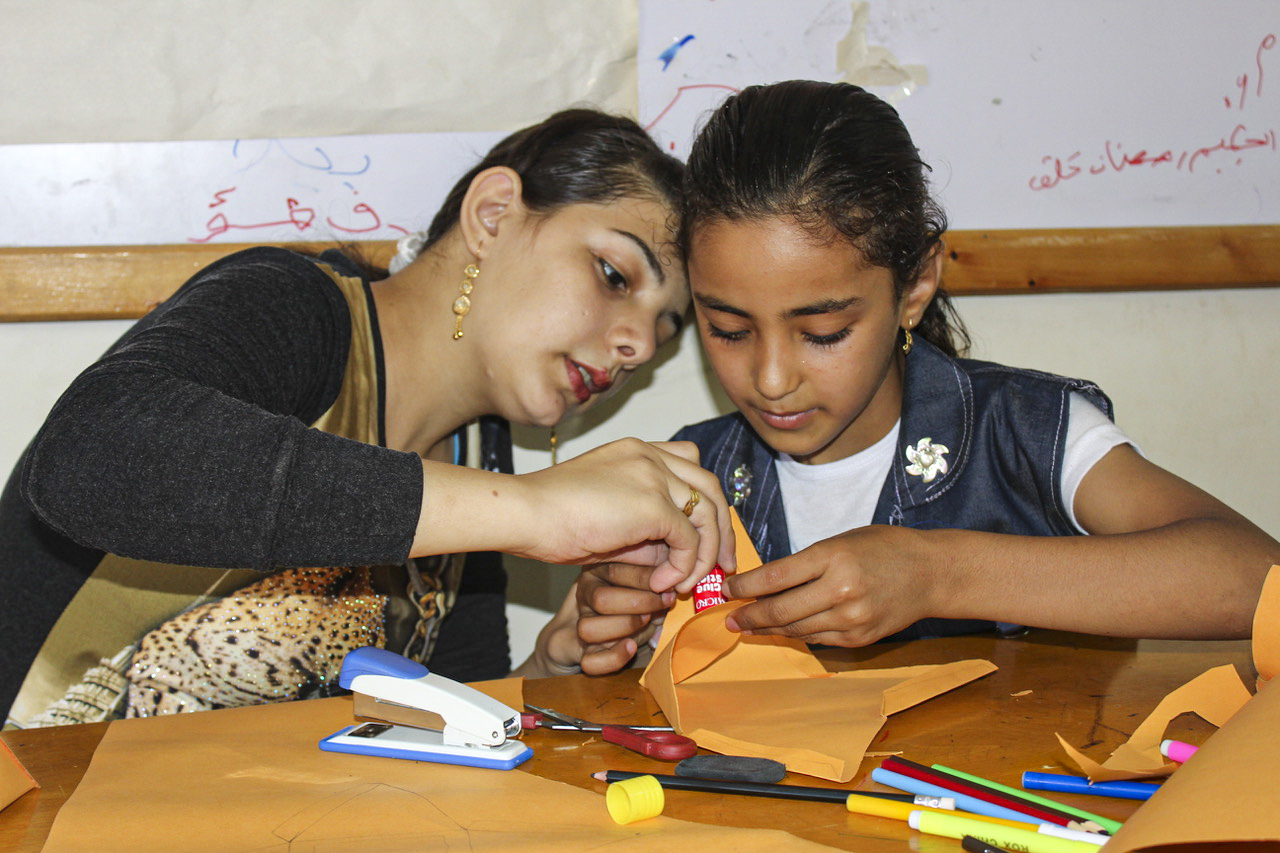
Two sisters of the Valuable Girl Project

Poverty, discrimination, gender-based violence and other obstacles often prevent Egyptian girls – both Christian and Muslim alike - from enjoying the opportunity to achieve their goals and advance in society. The Valuable Girl Project uses education and mentoring to support girls and young women so that they can stay in school, avoid early marriage, gain dignity in the classroom and at home, and become leaders in their community.

In a country where tensions between the Muslim majority and Coptic Christian minority often run high, the project promotes religious tolerance by bringing Christian and Muslim girls together in a safe space to learn mutual respect.

Young women in secondary school are trained to be “Big Sisters” and role models for their primary school “Little Sisters.” Girls learn skills one-on-one in workshops and in activities that tackle community problems. Coptic Orphans partners with local community development associations to reach the most vulnerable.

The Valuable Girl Project operates in 184 project sites across Egypt. As of 2021, more than 15,000 girls and young women have taken part in the project.

=== Diaspora Engagement ===
The Coptic diaspora has much to offer Egypt in terms of financial resources, knowledge and technical experience. Diaspora development has been shown to be effective, particularly when second and third-generation emigrants remain connected to the homeland.

Serve to Learn seeks to engage members of diaspora to volunteer with Coptic Orphans' program participants in Egypt. Although the target audience is members of the Coptic diaspora, Coptic Orphans welcomes any volunteer over 18, from anywhere around the world.

"The 21 takes young Copts from the diaspora (aged 18–23) to villages in Upper Egypt for a three-week volunteer program. The volunteers teach English in schools and meet families in their homes. For many, this will be the first time they travel to Egypt and for others, it is an opportunity to visit areas they would never otherwise have seen on their own. It’s a hands-on experience with the opportunity to meet and build long-lasting bonds with children, mothers, volunteers and staff".

The long-term goal of the program is to give overseas Copts a way to give back to the homeland while at the same time strengthening ties between Egypt and the diaspora.

Since 2002, 394 youths have traveled to Egypt from 11 countries: the USA, Canada, Australia, the UK, Kuwait, New Zealand, Finland, UAE, Austria, Denmark, and Sweden. Nearly 12,000 children have been served by these volunteers.

In addition to Serve to Learn and The 21, Coptic Orphans has several other diaspora engagement initiatives, including scholarship programs, an ambassador club, and mentorship opportunities.

== Partnership with Coptic Orthodox Church ==
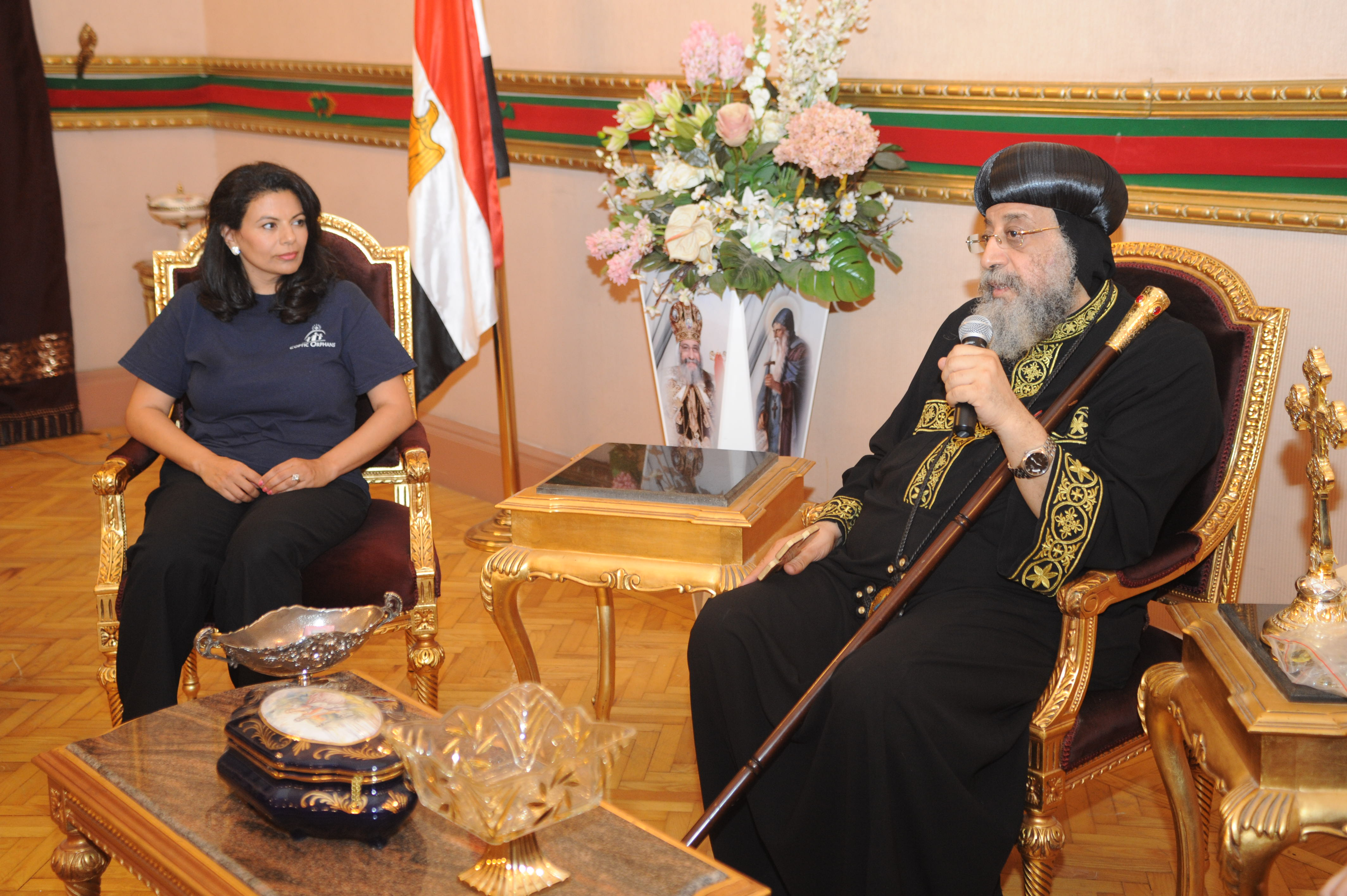
Pope Tawadros II with Coptic Orphans founder Nermien Riad

Coptic Orphans works in 64 dioceses in Egypt, in close partnership with each local bishop, who also identifies areas of local need and nominates volunteers.

Bishops from the Coptic Orthodox Church from all levels have expressed their support and encouragement for Coptic Orphans' work, including Pope Tawadros II, who sent Coptic Orphans a letter in June 2017 saying:

"We would also like to thank everyone who supports you in implementing these activities and programs in the field of education, which is the key solution for the developmental and social problems in Egypt, and for developing good citizens for their country and church."

Similarly, in a meeting with Coptic Orphans leaders and staff members, Pope Tawadros II noted that he was "very happy" with the organization's initiatives, citing that they are "very impactful" and "purpose-driven." Furthermore, he indicated that his favorite aspects of Coptic Orphans' initiatives were that they are organized and cultivate generations. Finally, he said, "[I]t is good that the Church is a friend to this wonderful service."

Pope Shenouda III of Alexandria, had also praised Coptic Orphans, writing: We appreciate very much what you are doing… you are saving God's children".

== Awards and recognition ==
In 2020, Coptic Orphans was awarded special consultative status with the United Nations Economic and Social Council.

In 2021, Coptic Orphans earned its tenth consecutive 4-star (highest) rating by Charity Navigator, awarded ten consecutive times to only 3% of the charities they evaluate, in recognition of Coptic Orphans' strong financial health, transparency and accountability.

The organization received letters of recognition from U.S. President Barack Obama, vice-president Dick Cheney and Australian Prime Minister Tony Abbott.

Coptic Orphans was awarded an honorable mention by the Washington Post in their 2005 Award for Excellence in Nonprofit Management.

== Leading by Example Award ==
The Coptic Orphans Leading by Example Award honors pioneers whose character and achievements make them role models in Egypt and around the world.

The Board of Directors of Coptic Orphans present the Leading by Example Award each year at the Coptic Orphans annual gala to people who demonstrate a spirit of volunteerism, a love of children and education, a commitment to giving back to the community, and a deep and enduring devotion to an Egypt of respect, prosperity, and peace for all people.

Previous winners of the award include:

- U.S. Congressman Jeff Fortenberry
- Pope Tawadros II
- Former NASA scientist Farouk El-Baz
- Former Deputy Commissioner of the New South Wales Police Force, Nick Kaldas
- U.S. Congresswoman and former U.S. Deputy Assistant Secretary of State for Near Eastern Affairs, Liz Cheney

== See also ==
- Coptic Orthodox
- Youth organization
