= Young Yatri Organization =

Nepalese non-profit youth organization

- Logo
- Abbreviation: YYO
- Formation: November 2009
- Type: Youth organization
- Legal status: Non-profit organization
- Purpose: Youth empowerment in Nepal
- Headquarters: Tripureshwor, KTM, Nepal
- Location: Nepal
- Members: Young people ages 13-25
- Main organ: Board of Directors

Young Yatri Organization is a not-for-profit youth organization, operating in Nepal. The institution was established in November 2009, by seven high school students aiming for the growth and development of youths of Nepal.

== Aims ==
YYO aims to provide a platform and knowledge to the youth so that they can realize their capabilities and responsibilities. YYO believes that, when empowered, the youth will develop the sense humanity, patriotism and rationality that is needed for the enhancement and well-functioning of the society.

== How YYO works ==
YYO chose its medium to be theater, more specifically Forum Theatre. After its first two events, YYO realized that to successfully affect the youth it has to approach it through ways other than theater too. Hence, YYO extended itself to incorporate Event Creation and Management under its working methods. "Youth Jatra, ...My Journey from 7 to 14" and "Youth for Development" are the events which have till now been created by YYO.

== Experience ==
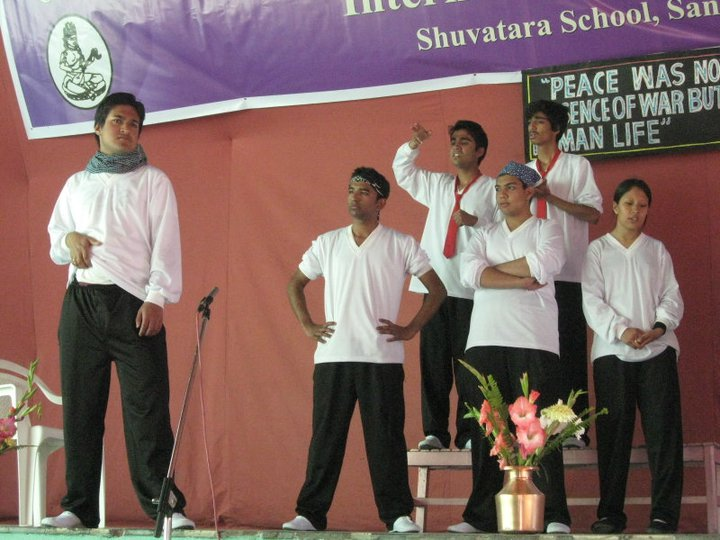
Paath...sala

=== Paath..sala ===
Performers
Loonibha Karki Tuladhar, Bibek Babu Pokharel, Bideha Agam, Bidesh Thapaliya, Bishaka Karki, Devashish Sharma, Parash Upreti, Prakash Subedi, Robin Sharma, Shushma Adhikari

In January 2010, Saraswati Teaching and Resource Center organized the 6th International Teachers Conference, which was attended by more than 700 teachers. At the event, the Young Yatri Organization performed a forum theater play "Paath...sala". Forum Theatre is a type of theatre where the theatrical performance can be stopped at some point, and from there on the audience will suggest how should the play proceed. The audience can either give suggestions to the actors about what is to be done, the audience can add themselves in the play as another character or they can replace some of the existing characters of the play. The play addressed the issues of school bullying, teachers lackadaisical nature and disrespect to culture. Paath...sala was directed by honorary member Mrs. Loonibha Karki Tuladhar.

=== Modiaain ===
Modiaain was written by Biseshwor Prasad Koirala in 2036 B.S. (traditional Nepali calendar). This is the same year when there was a national upheaval against the Panchayat system in Nepal. The novel is inspired by events that occurred years ago which occurred when Koirala was a child, which Koirala tried to link with the present.

In order to revive the interest of young people in their own literature and to give them a platform to take a pride in it, Modiaain was organized. Modiaain was compiled and directed by Mr. Birendra Hamal and acted by the actors of Rastriya Nach Ghar. The play was viewed by around 300 youths.

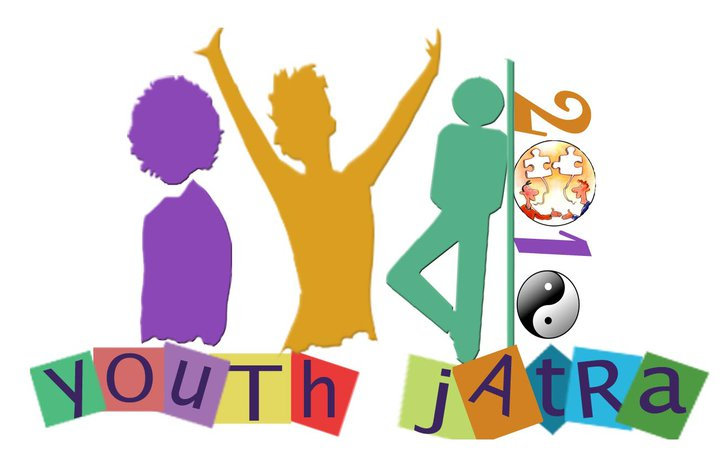
Youth Jatra - When the era of Mutual Understanding Begins

=== Youth Jatra ===
On August 12, International Youth Day 2010 was celebrated by youth all over the world. For the celebration of International Youth Day 2010 in Nepal, an event was organized by 19 youth organizations of Nepal, named Youth Jatra. YOUTH JATRA 2010 also celebrated the beginning of International Youth Year August 2010 - August 2011. Young Yatri Organization was one of the organizers. First of its kind in Nepal, Youth Jatra is a platform "of the youth, by the youth and for the youth". Total attendandance for the event was around 2000. The mega event included:

- Musical concert
- B-boying
- Table Talks
- Theatrical performances
- Documentary screening
- Art exhibition and workshop
- Photo exhibition
- Youth entrepreneur stalls
- Blood donation programs

==== dOBATO... ====
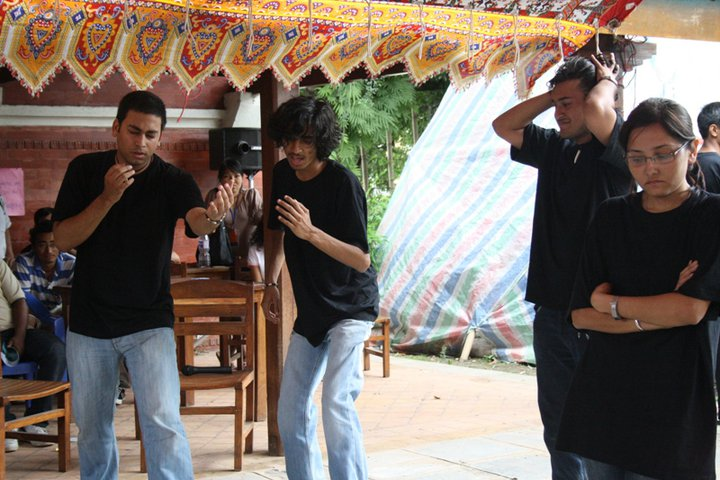
dOBATO

Performers
Astha Pokharel, Bhupendra Sharma, Bibek Babu Pokharel, Bideha Agam, Bidesh Thapaliya, Bishaka Karki, Devashish Sharma, Niranjana Pokharel, Sandesh Mohan Adhikary, Shubham Sapkota

"dOBATO", which means junction, was YYO's second forum theater experience. This play was directed and acted by the members of YYO. The theatrical performance was named "dOBATO" because all the characters and spectators of the play faced dilemmas and had to make choices during the play.

Staged in Alliance Française, Tripureshwor, Kathmandu on 11 August 2010, it was one of the events of YOUTH JATRA 2010. "dOBATO" portrayed six youths, out of which three were so-called "hooligans". "dOBATO" attempted to familiarize the audience with their characters, their way of thinking and their background. The "hooligans" represented the depressed youth of Nepal who are involved in drug abuse and other misdemeanors. The other three are youths from well-off families.

At the climax, the three "hooligans" commit a felony and find themselves in trouble. At that point, the play is handed over to the audience - the audience was given the chance to suggest how should the play proceed, to introduce themselves as a new character or to modify one of the characters or the story itself. Almost all of the audience participated in some way in the play - starting from drug abuse the theatrical discussion highlighted the issues of AIDS, family's responsibilities and even national problems like political instability. This section was filled with numerous attempts by the audience to convince the "hooligans" to come back to the right path.

=== … My journey from 7 to 14.. ===
One photo equals thousand words. With this assertion Subesksha Shrestha started her journey to photography at the age of seven and has captured in her camera photographs ranging from political figures to unknown victims, from mountains to meadows, from hooliganism to heritage. She is registered in the Guinness Book of World Records as World's Youngest Girl Photographer.

This was a five-day event from 12–17 September. Through this exhibition YYO encouraged Subeksha to continue her dedication to photography and she interacted with more than 500 students who came to the exhibition.

=== Activista Big Bang ===
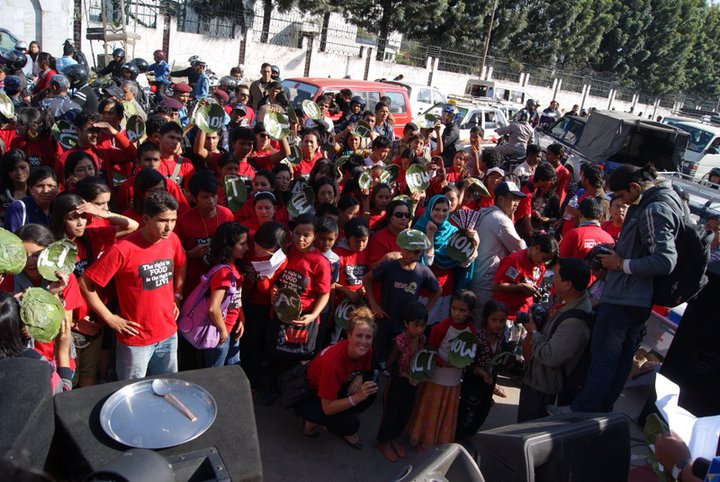
FOOD for ALL!!

In partnership with Activista, youth network of Actionaid, YYO helped to organize an event called "Activista Big Bang" on 4 November 2010. With an aim to pressurize political parties to include Right to Food in the constitution, YYO performed activities such as flash mobs and concerts. More than 500 youth participated in the event.

=== Red Ribbon Campaign ===
Young Yatri Organisation performed a forum theater focusing on the topic of AIDS on December 2 at Xavier International College, KTM. The play was viewed by more than 300 students. YYO raised the issue of unsafe sex and drug abuse in the play, portraying these as two of the main causes of HIV infection. The play also depict the social and personal trauma HIV infected persons have to suffer.

== Board of directors ==
- Bibek Babu Pokharel- Director for Event and Resource Management
- Bidesh Thapaliya - Director for Organizational Management
- Devashish Sharma - Director For Public and International Relations
- Parash Upreti - Director For Account and Administration
- Richa Rajbhandari - Director for Marketing and Promotion
- Smriti Basnet - Director for Publication
