= YERID =

YERID is an Armenian youth organization based in Istanbul, Turkey.

== History ==
The organization was created in 2001 by the Armenian Patriarchate of Constantinople and continues to receive sponsorship from the Patriarchate today. It is named as such because YERID is short for "Yeridasart" meaning youth in Armenian. YERID aims at bringing together the Armenian youth in Istanbul through social interaction and various activities. The president of the organization is Arden Güldemir.
