= Kadet Remaja Sekolah Malaysia =

Youth organization in Malaysia

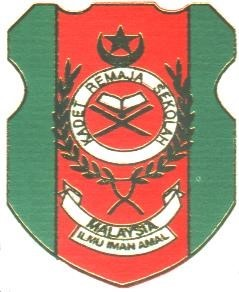
- Abbreviation: KRS and TKRS (Tunas Kadet Remaja)
- Formation: 27 June 1987
- Type: School-based Government-owned Youth organisation
- Legal status: Active
- Purpose: Alternative uniformed body
- Headquarters: Kuala Lumpur
- Location: Malaysia
- Members: Open to all primary and secondary students
- Founder: 1. Hj Muhammad Thani bin Sha'aban (SMK RAJA ABDULLAH); 2. Datuk Hj Anuar Ab Aziz (SMK SERI TITIWANGSA); 3.Ustaz Hj Ahmad Farazila Ab Ghani (SMK TAMAN TUN DR ISMAIL)
- Main organ: National-level committee
- Affiliations: Ministry of Education

Kadet Remaja Sekolah Malaysia (Malay for Malaysia School Youth Cadet Corps) is a scout-like movement organised by the Government of Malaysia as a youth organisation.

== History ==
Kadet Remaja Sekolah was founded by Muhammad Thani Bin Sha'aban at SM Raja Abdullah, Jalan Kepong, Kuala Lumpur. Initially, this organisation was known as Kadet Putera Islam Malaysia (literally: Malaysian Islamic Male Students Cadet Corps) and its membership was open to SM Raja Abdullah Islam Students' Association. It had only 20 members in the beginning consisting of Form 1 and Form 2 students only.

The Kadet Putera Islam Malaysia had its activities based on "Islam as a way of life". In 1989, a few other schools in the Federal Territories organised Kadet Putera Islam Malaysia. The schools that organised them were SMK Taman Tun Dr Ismail under the leadership of Ustaz Ahmad Farazilla Bin Abdul Ghani, SM Sri Titiwangsa under the leadership of Mr. Anuar Bin Abd Aziz and SM Ma'ahad Hamidiah, Kajang, Selangor under the leadership of En. Abu Hassan Bin Morad.

In 1993, 53 secondary schools had organised Kadet Putera Islam Malaysia. The effort to make Kadet Putera Islam Malaysia as an official uniformed body under the Ministry of Education beginning on 10 August 1993. A meeting with the Director of Education of Malaysia, Yang Berbahagia Tan Sri Datuk Dr. Wan Mohd Zahid Bin Wan Mohd Nordin was held on 13 September that year. In this meeting, the thesis about Kadet Putera Islam Malaysia (KPIM) was discussed. A committee was formed to prepare cabinet documents. The committee planned to change KPIM to the name Kadet Putera-Puteri Islam (Islam Boys' and Girls' Cadet Corps). However, this name was again changed to Kadet Remaja Islam/Youth Islam Cadet Corps (KRIS)

In the meantime, the talk about KRIS to the Education Directors was held in October 1993 and was chaired by YB Tan Sri Datuk Dr. Wan Mohd Zahid. He made the decision to change KRIS to the name Kadet Remaja Sekolah Malaysia (KRS). It was officially launched on 20 June 1995 and its membership opened to all boys and girls regardless or religion. Since then, many schools began to bring in this youth organisation as they see the importance of uniformed groups in bringing up a student's discipline. KRS groups are mostly formed when a new school is established or brought in by the administrator of the schools which are established earlier.

== Ranks ==
=== Cadets (Primary/Tunas) ===
Primary school student cadets, who are also known as Tunas KRS (literally: young KRS) wear the rank badge above the right shirt pocket. The highest rank for primary student cadet is Sergeant.

The rank structure for primary student cadets include:

- Lance Corporal TKRS
- Corporal TKRS
- Sergeant TKRS

=== Cadets (Secondary Students) ===
Secondary school cadets wear their rank, indicated by their epaulettes, on both sides of the shoulder straps. The highest rank for a secondary school cadet is Warrant Officer 1.

The ranks of Lance Corporal and Corporal are awarded on school-based examinations and can vary significantly from school to school. The Exam Card provided in the KRS Handbook (Buku Panduan KRS) is rarely followed. For the rank of Sergeant, students have to attend courses held by the District Education Office and those who passed will be awarded with a certificate stating the promotion of rank. Sometimes, the Staff Sergeant course is held together with the Sergeant course. Cadets who passed the rank of Staff Sergeant will be chosen to attend the Warrant Officer course. The course for Warrant Officers used to be held at a national level, and is a very prestigious award for cadets. Normally not more than only 20 cadets are awarded with the rank of Warrant Officer 1 nationwide, while 50 awards of Warrant Officer 2. Since 2009, Warrant Officer courses are now held state level to provide more chances for cadets and produce more Warrant Officers.

The ranks for secondary student cadets, along with their epaulettes, are:

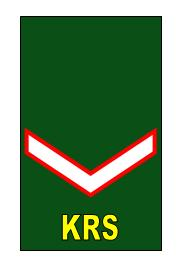
Lance Corporal

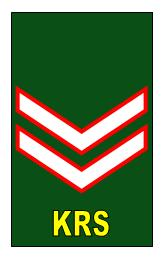
Corporal

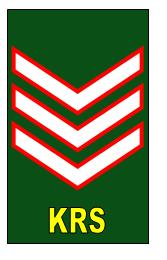
Sergeant
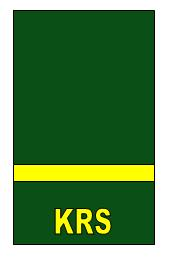
Staff Sergeant

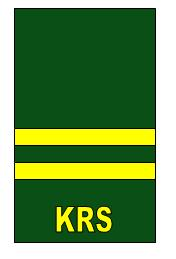
Warrant Officer 2

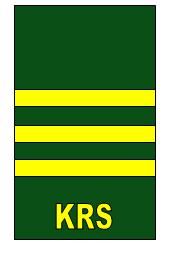
Warrant Officer 1

=== Officers ===
Ranks are from the lowest to the highest.

- Cadet Officer (Officer before attending any KRS courses, except for member who are staff sergeant and above)
- Sub-Lieutenant (Officer after attending Officer Course Level 1 or 5 years membership in krs with STPM/diploma/equivalent certificate )
- Lieutenant (after attending Officer Course Level 2)
- Captain (Bachelor's degree)
- Major
- Lieutenant Colonel
- Colonel
- Brigedier General
- Major General
- Lieutenant General (School Section Director)
- General (Deputy Education Director)
- Field Marshal (Education Director)

== Uniform ==
There are three types of KRS uniforms, namely Uniform No. 2, Uniform No. 3 and Uniform No. 4. There is also a type of informal activity attire (Uniform No.1) which is the KRS T-shirt with track bottoms. The most frequently used uniform is the Sherwood Dark Green Uniform No.4. The Uniform No. 4 is considered the official uniform of KRS. Uniform No. 4 consists of the Sherwood Dark Green long-sleeved smart shirt and trousers, beret, name tag, logos, collar dots, badges and lanyard. Additional items include a hackle for the beret, muffler and gloves. Boots are required when wearing the Uniform No. 4 and they include spike boots and drill boots (when drilling). Students seldom afford to purchase the Uniform No. 3 as it is an optional uniform for students which consists of a light green smart shirt and slack pants or school uniform trousers (olive green). Uniform No. 2 is a more formal activity attire which is a half-uniform. The cap badge of the KRS beret is worn on the right side (other groups wear them on the left side).

It is compulsory for KRS nationwide in Malaysia to wear their uniform every Wednesday during school hours. Officers (teachers) are required to do so too. Officers normally chose to wear the Uniform No. 3 as it is more lightweight and airy. There are also bush jackets and ceremonial uniforms (pakaian istiadat) for high-ranking KRS officers which are normally education officers.

== Criticisms ==
The current training system of KRS is handled by officers who are teachers at the same time. Unlike other youth organisations like Scouts (Rover Scouts, King Scouts, etc.), all the officer ranks are exclusively reserved for teachers only. Many of them attended a few days courses/seminars which is insufficient to teach the cadets. There is no intakes/courses available for the cadets who graduated in their secondary school. Although various associations are established to enable the ex-members to continue serving their units, most of them are concerned about their own respective schools' cadet corps only and the changes they made are not applicable to other schools no matter how constructive they are. There is no official association, rankings and system for graduated members. There is a call to establish a system for adult members and open the officer ranks to them. By doing so, many experienced ex-members will continue to serve the unit and share the burden of the teachers. Some suggestions are focused on making the teachers as advisors only and the part/full-time instructor will handle the training for the cadets.
