= Kids for Peace =

Global youth organisation

Kids for Peace Logo

Kids for Peace is a global, nonprofit, 501(c)(3) youth organization. Kids for Peace has over 100 chapters, spanning six continents. The organization's goal is to promote peace, kindness, and cultural understanding among children globally through various activities, including organizing The Great Kindness Challenge, publishing inspirational books, and establishing a network of chapters worldwide to foster unity among children from diverse backgrounds.

Kids for Peace was founded in 2006 in Carlsbad, California, by Danielle Gram and Jill McManigal. Danielle Gram's efforts in establishing Kids for Peace earned her the Nestlé Very Best in Youth Award in 2007. Jill McManigal, then executive director, was honored with a Bank of America Local Hero award in November 2009 for her contributions to the organization.

== Peace Packs ==
One of the principal activities of Kids for Peace chapters is sending "Peace Packs" to other children around the world. Peace Packs are hand-painted knapsacks filled with school supplies, toiletries, a toy, and a personal note of friendship. Prior to making Peace Packs, Kids for Peace members learn about the culture of the recipients, often from a guest speaker who has lived there.

== Peace Hero Awards ==
Each year, Kids for Peace chooses a Peace Hero, a well-recognized role model chosen by the children of Kids for Peace. Peace Heroes are selected based on their living by the words of the Peace Pledge, their contribution to making the world a better place, and the way they inspire youth to be their best selves. Past Peace Hero award recipients include Tony Hawk (2009), Rob Machado (2008), Frances Fisher (2007), and Susan Sarandon (2015).

== The Great Kindness Challenge ==
The Great Kindness Challenge Logo

In 2008 Kids for Peace launched an annual event called The Great Kindness Challenge. It takes place on the second Saturday in August and is open to youth of all ages. The Great Kindness Challenge is one day where kids around the world dedicate themselves to performing as many acts of kindness as possible, using a checklist of 50 suggestions. These acts of kindness range from holding the door open for someone to cleaning up a local park to making sack lunches for homeless people. In 2009, The Great Kindness Challenge involved at least 35 countries in six continents. By 2024, the challenge has created over one billion acts of kindness across 135 countries.

== Books ==
Kids for Peace published its first book, Peace Through Our Eyes: A Book of Hope and Inspiration, in 2008. It features words and drawings by kids responding to the question “What does peace mean to you?” Kids for Peace produced its second book, Wish Big: Children’s Wishes for the World, in 2010.

Two more books were later published, Create the Change: A Kids’ Guide to Transforming the World (2016) and Kindness Matters: 50 Ways to Create a Kinder World (2017).

== History ==
Kids for Peace was founded in 2006 in Carlsbad, California, by Danielle Gram, then a high school student, and Jill McManigal, mother of Hana and Bodhi and a children’s playwright and director.

Gram’s work in creating Kids for Peace contributed to her selection as a winner of the Nestlé Very Best in Youth Award in 2007. She graduated from Harvard University after studying religion and sociology. She went on work in Pader, Uganda, teaching life skills to child victims of the Lord's Resistance Army. Her service work and travels were detailed on her blog. As of 2025, she still works with Kids for Peace.

Ms. McManigal, a former elementary school teacher, became the executive director of Kids for Peace. She continues to hold this post as of February 2025. In November 2009, Ms. McManigal received a Bank of America Local Hero award, recognizing her work through Kids for Peace.

From the initial gathering of neighborhood children in Ms. McManigal’s home, the organization has grown to over 100 chapters worldwide, spanning all six inhabited continents. Countries as diverse as Australia, Sierra Leone, Bangladesh, the Dominican Republic, Greece, and Mongolia are now home to Kids for Peace chapters.

In 2020, Kids for Peace had almost 150 chapters across 121 countries, encompassing more than 15 million children. By 2024, the organization had reached 21 million children.

In 2024, Kids for Peace announced a partnership with Jazzercize for the 2025 Great Kindness Challenge.

In 2025, Kids for Peace held its annual Peace Hero Gala honoring Abby Wambach, a two-time Olympic gold medalist and FIFA World Cup champion, as the Peace Hero chosen by Kids for Peace youth.
