= Bangladesh-China Youth Student Association =

Platform

Bangladesh China Youth Student Association (BCYSA)
- Motto: A platform for Bangladeshi students and professional in China
- Location: Beijing, P.R. China
- Established: 25 November 2016
- President: Md. Moneruzzaman
- General secretary: Md. Amirul Islam
- Website: www.bcysa.org

The Bangladesh-China Youth Student Association or simply BCYSA (Bengali: বাংলাদেশ চায়না ইয়ুথ স্টুডেন্ট অ্যাসোসিয়েশন) is a platform for Bangladeshi students and professionals in China with the aim of strengthening cooperation between the two countries, and promoting a deeper understanding. This organization was established in 2016.

== History ==
From independence onwards, Bangladeshi students and professionals have been traveling to China. But a long time passed before an organization for Bangladeshi students and professionals was formed in 2016. Until then most of the students and professionals were involved in small groups through various social media platforms. Many had worked hard to bring all students and professionals living in China under one umbrella for their welfare and cooperation. Soon after coming to China to pursue his Ph.D., the founding President of BCYSA, Professor Dr. Md. Shahabul Haque had felt the necessity for a voluntary organization for the Bangladeshi students and professionals residing in China. Fortunately, many students and professionals also expressed interest in his idea. Subsequently, while on a visit to China Radio International in Beijing, he met with Yu Guangyue Anandi, Head of Bangla Department of Chinese Media Group, and shared his interest to form an organization of Bangladeshi students and professionals, and she praised and encouraged the initiative. Afterwards, having held a meeting with a group of enthusiastic individuals in China, on November 25, 2016, a new organization was formed with 13 members under the leadership of Professor Dr. Md. Shahabul Haque. Like the Association of Bangladesh-China Alumni (ABCA), it is one of the most active and influential organizations of Bangladeshi students and professionals living in China. Since then, every year BCYSA has been organizing its annual general meeting with the help of BCYSA's executive committee.

BCYSA launched its website in 2017 and operates all its activities through this online platform. BCYSA's online Bengali bi-annual "Mahaprachir" started its journey in June 2019. BCYSA-online news portal started its journey in October 2019 and has been publishing up to now. The organization also has a research wing where professionals in various fields are trained by experts. Every year, BCYSA presents the "BCYSA Community Award" to Bangladeshi students and professionals living in China in recognition of their exemplary achievements and contributions in bridging the gap and building friendships between the two countries.

In addition, BCYSA assists Bangladeshi students in obtaining scholarships from Chinese universities, employment in Chinese institutions, and doing business in China. BCYSA also provides assistance to individuals seeking help in various universities and cities in China. In this regard, BCYSA's campus representatives play a vital role with regard to providing assistance for people in need. On the whole, BCYSA plays a phenomenal role to promote both country's philosophy, culture, and positive diplomatic relations between the two countries.

== List of presidents and general secretaries ==
	Year	Presidents	General Secretaries
1	2017-2018	Md. Shahabul Haque	Mohammad Zamal Uddin
2	2018-2019	Md. Shahabul Haque	Mohammad Zamal Uddin
3	2019-2020	A. A. M. Muzahid	Aga Mostafizur Rahman Chowdhury
4	2020-21	A. A. M. Muzahid	Muhammad Shahanul Islam
5	2021-22	Maruf Hasan	Aga Mostafizur Rahman Chowdhury
6	2022-23	Maruf Hasan	Md Khairul Islam
7	2023-24	A B Siddik	Md Zannatul Arif
8	2024-25	Md Zannatul Arif	Md. Moneruzzaman
9	2025-26	Md. Moneruzzaman	Md. Amirul Islam

== Activities ==
All of the activities of the BCYSA are volunteering. BCYSA predominantly focuses on improving the understanding among people of two great friendly nations. BCYSA promotes Chinese philosophy, culture and ethics, the development of science and technology, and Chinese trade. BCYSA is highly committed to serving the Bangladeshi Community in China in all possible ways including academic, professional, and personal affairs.

=== BCYSA Belt and Road Training Academy ===
BCYSA launched the Belt and Road training program for Bangladeshi students and professionals living in China. The program is designed to help them improve their knowledge in the academic and professional arena. It is a non-commercial and non-profitable online training academy that intends to organize a series of lectures, webinars, and training sessions for Bangladeshi students and professionals in China to enrich their knowledge by learning through their mother tongue.

=== BCYSA Online News ===
The BCYSA News aims to provide authentic news and information specifically for the Bangladeshi community residing in China. This includes information on current events, important issues, and other useful information. BCYSA NEWS is dedicated to publishing the achievement of Bangladeshi Scholars and professionals in China. It is committed to publishing the true story of the China Government on the news portal in Bengali to let the Bangladeshi people know more in a better way. It always covers any support to Bangladeshi people residing in China. It publishes cultural events in China. BCYSA News also frequently publishes articles, on activities of Chinese Universities, career opportunities, friendship and diplomatic information between China and Bangladesh, and so on.

=== BCYSA Online Magazine Mohaprachir ===
BCYSA publishes an online bi-annual magazine called Mahaprachir (মহাপ্রাচীর, The Great Wall). It incorporates research-based articles on Belt and Road Initiative, trade, information on trade fairs in China, Chinese philosophy and culture, Bangladeshi students' activities in China, popular information on the last six months in China, and so on. It has been published since 2019.

=== BCYSA Community Award ===
The BCYSA Community Award is an annual event that recognizes and celebrates the exemplary achievements and contributions of individuals who have worked to promote friendship between Bangladesh and China. The award aims to promote friendship between the two countries by celebrating community services, outstanding contributions to community services, leadership, journalism and writing, and academic success.

==== BCYSA Community Award-2021 ====
BCYSA Community Award-2021 was announced in five categories:

	category	winner	institution
1	Outstanding Journalist Award	Abu Sayeed and Jahid Hasan Tuhin	Changsha University of Science and Technology; Jiangsu Agri-Animal Husbandry Vocational College
2	Outstanding Photography Award	Ishtiaq Ahmed	Jiangnan University
3	Outstanding Volunteer Award	Akib Irfan	Central China Normal University
4	Outstanding Visual Artist Award	Subrata Kumer	Nanjing University of the Arts
5	Outstanding Writer Award	Ajoy Kanti Mondal	Fujian Agriculture and Forestry University
