= PDMU =

Mexican youth organization

University Militarized Sports Pentathlon
- Pentathlón Deportivo Militarizado Universitario
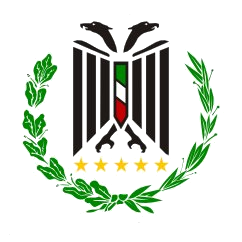
- Shield of the PDMU
- Active: July 9, 1938; 86 years ago
- Country: Mexico
- Nickname(s): "Penta"
- Motto(s): Patria, Honor y Fuerza (Country, Honor and Strength)
- Colors: Grey, Blue and Gold
- Mascot(s): Grizzly bear
- Anniversaries: July 9

Commanders
- Current commander: Raúl Hernández Padilla
- Notable commanders: Jorge Jiménez Cantú; Armando León Bejarano; Jorge Gilling Cabrera

Insignia
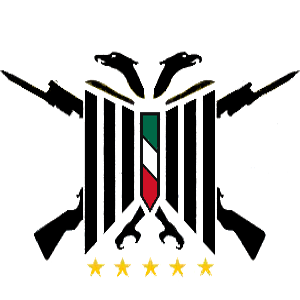
- Infantry

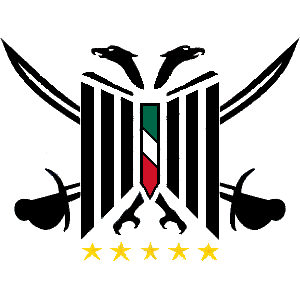
- Cavalry

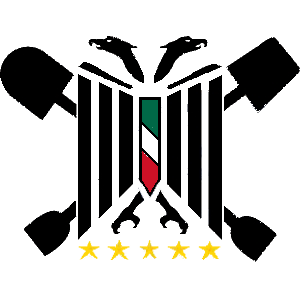
- Youth

PDMU or Pentathlón Deportivo Militarizado Universitario (University Militarized Sports Pentathlon), is a youth organization that was created in Mexico in 1938. PDMU pursues "the greatness of the country" by training Mexican boys and girls. The organization's motto is "Patria, honor y fuerza" ('country, honor and strength').

Despite its Mexican-patriotic spirit, PDMU has presence outside of Mexico, among Mexican communities in Portland, Oregon; Chicago, Illinois; and Saint Paul, Minnesota; under the flag of the Pentathlon Deportivo Militarizado Universitario of America United States and Canada. The Canadian unit that was active for some time does not exist anymore, as their existence cannot be verified.
