= UthMag =

Youth organization based in Dubai UAE

UthMag is a youth organization based in Dubai U.A.E. UthMag started with the motive of helping the youth in the UAE in realizing their potential and understanding what it is that they would like to do for the rest of their lives. Every department and position in UthMag is filled by University of High school Students. With the immense success rate with the youth in the region UthMag has gained quite a following in the social media and has been in the newspapers and television interview for it too.

UthMag has been responsible for many firsts in the region; with the representation of youth organizations at the Diego Maradona press conference to being the only youth organization at the Duke University versus UAE basketball Game. UthMag was recently also the official support partner for the Chris Brown concert where no other youth organizations were present.
