= Student Union of Tampere University =

Student union in Tampere, Finland

- Tampereen ylioppilaskunta
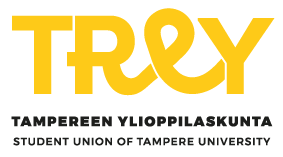
- Abbreviation: TREY
- Formation: 2019
- Merger of: The Student Union of Tampere University of Technology, The Student Union of the University of Tampere
- Legal status: Student union
- Region served: Tampere
- Members: 19,000
- Secretary General: Adam Zeidan
- Chair of the Board: Tami Nordström
- Chair of the Council: Alex Siira
- Website: trey.fi

The Student Union of Tampere University (Finnish: Tampereen ylioppilaskunta, commonly known by the acronym TREY) is a Finnish student union that was formed in the fusion of The Student Union of Tampere University of Technology and The Student Union of the University of Tampere. As a student union, the purpose of TREY is to defend student interests in Tampere. TREY protects the interests of students, facilitates the work of student associations, provides services for its members as well as creates a sense of community.

The Chair of Board of the Student Union in 2026 is Tami Nordström and the Chair of the Council of Representatives is Alex Siira. The Secretary General of the Student Union is currently Adam Zeidan.

== Organisation ==
TREY's membership includes all the undergraduate student who study at Tampere University. The number of members is 19,000 making TREY the second largest student union in Finland. Doctoral and exchange students at Tampere University can choose to join the student union, as well. Students become members of TREY by paying the membership fee and registering at the university. In total, TREY has approximately 19,000 members, who study in Tampere, Turku, Pori and Seinäjoki.

In the organisation of the student union, the highest decision-making power belongs to the Council of Representatives, who are elected from among the members every two years in representative elections. The council appoints the Executive Board, which decides on the day-to-day operations of the student union. For the purpose of providing daily services and doing long-term advocacy work, the student union employs a number of specialists and office staff.

== Operations ==
=== Advocacy ===
The student union promotes the interests of its members, especially at Tampere University and the City of Tampere, but also in the Finnish society. The student union has policy outlines decided by the Council of Representatives, within the framework of which advocacy work is carried out. Advocacy work happens in different sectors, such as educational affairs, social affairs and international affairs. Advocacy work is also done in cooperation with student associations.

=== Associations ===
Over 160 associations operate within TREY. Advocacy associations operate on the faculty level, and their members are other associations. The advocacy associations supervise the interests of their faculty’s students, organise training for their member associations and build community spirit within the faculty. Subject associations with student intake are consortiums of students of certain subjects or fields, which advocate for their members in the degree programmes and organise free-time activities for the students. They also organise tutoring together with the student union and the university. The subject associations in engineering fields are called guilds. Other subject associations are subject associations that don’t have student intake. They do the same things as the other subject associations, but you can usually become a member when you know your area of specialisation. Most associations within TREY are hobby associations that operate on the basis of a hobby, interest or conviction. Vocational clubs are hobby associations dedicated to specific fields. Vocational clubs maintain relationships between students, institutions and companies in the field in a manner very similar to subject associations without student intake.

==== Student associations and guilds with student intake ====
Council of Representatives

Type
- Houses: Viva - Tampereen yliopiston vihreä vasemmisto (7) Vihreä lista (6) MedBoomare (5) Kahden Tähden Teekkarit (5) Kyltyrböndet (5) Kontakti (4) RATTOISA (3) International Representatives Group (3) Brothers and Sisters of Alpha-Chemistry (2) Hallintotieteiden liitto (2) Pro Kasvatustieteilijät (2) Oikeisto-opiskelijat (1) KeltaPunaSininen (1) Treyn Demariopiskelijat (1) Keskeiset (1) Luuppi_Puolue (1)

Leadership
- Chair: Alex Siira (Vihreä lista)
- 1st vice-chair: Aurora Kuusisto (Kontakti)
- 2nd vice-chair: Jan Windia (Kyltyrböndet)
- Seats: 49

Elections
- Voting system: Proportional representation
- Next election: Autumn 2027

- Tampereen yliopiston filosofian opiskelijoiden ainejärjestö Aatos
- Tampereen kestävän digitalisaation opiskelijat Access ry
- Automaatiotekniikan kilta Autek
- Bioteekkarikilta Bioner
- Bioteknologian opiskelijoiden ainejärjestö Biopsi ry
- Tampereen yliopiston kauppatieteiden opiskelijat - Boomi ry
- MDP in Leadership for Change students Complex ry
- Tampereen psykologian opiskelijoiden ainejärjestö Cortex ry
- Dialekti ry
- Energiamurroskilta ry Emu
- Teknis-luonnontieteellinen kilta Hiukkanen
- Tampereen yliopiston politiikan tutkimuksen ainejärjestö Iltakoulu ry
- Tuotantotalouden kilta Indecs ry
- Tampereen yliopiston sosiaalitieteiden ja yhteiskuntatutkimuksen opiskelijoiden aineyhdistys Interaktio ry
- International Teekkari Guild INTO Tampere ry
- Tampereen yliopiston varhaiskasvatuksen opiskelijoiden ainejärjestö ITU ry
- Kasvo ry – Tampereen yliopiston kasvatustieteiden opiskelijat
- Tampereen yliopiston suomen kielen opiskelijoiden ainejärjestö Kopula ry
- Koneenrakentajakilta KoRK
- Tampereen yliopiston matematiikan, tilastotieteen ja tietojenkäsittelytieteiden opiskelijoiden ainejärjestö Luuppi ry
- Tietojohtajakilta Man@ger
- Tampereen yliopiston kasvatustieteen ja aikuiskasvatuksen ainejärjestö Mentor ry
- Materiaali-insinöörikilta MIK
- Teatterityön tutkinto-ohjelma Näty
- Tampereen yliopiston luokanopettajaksi opiskelevien ainejärjestö OKA ry
- Tampereen yliopiston historianopiskelijat Patina ry
- Porin yliopistokeskuksella toimiva Porin ylioppilasyhdistys Pointer ry
- Tampereen yliopiston puheviestinnän opiskelijoiden ainejärjestö Reettorit ry
- Robotiikan kilta ry Robo
- Tampereen yliopiston terveystieteiden ainejärjestö Salus ry
- Sähkökilta ry, Skilta
- Tampereen yliopiston sosiaalityön opiskelijoiden ainejärjestö SOS ry
- Tampereen yliopiston hallintotieteitä opiskelevien ainejärjestö Staabi ry
- Tampereen Arkkitehtikilta TamArk
- Tampereen Aineenopettajaksi Opiskelevat TamAus ry
- Tampereen Rakentajakilta TARAKI
- TaSciEn - Tampere Science and Engineering Students' association ry
- Tampereen yliopiston kirjallisuuden opiskelijoiden ainejärjestö Teema ry
- Tampereen TietoTeekkarikilta TiTe
- Tampere International Global Society Students (TIPSY)
- Tampereen Lääketieteen Kandidaattiseura ry
- Tampereen yliopiston informaatiotutkimuksen ja mediatutkimuksen opiskelijat UDK ry
- Tampereen yliopiston erityisopettajaopiskelijat UNIK ry
- Tampere University Students of Sustainable Urban Development Urbanum ry
- Tampereen yliopiston journalistiikan ja visuaalisen journalismin opiskelijoiden ainejärjestö Vostok ry
- Ympäristöteekkarikilta ry, YKI
- Tampereen yliopiston logopedian opiskelijoiden ainejärjestö Ääni ry

=== Member services ===
The member services provided by the student union are accessible to all members and associations. The member services include, among other things, a student card, rental services (vans, sports equipment and games), and counselling services.

=== Tutoring ===
Tampere University is responsible for student tutoring, but TREY is tasked with responsibilities such as organising tutor recruitment and tutor training. TREY is actively in contact with the tutoring organisers and international organisers in subject associations.

=== Student union magazine Visiiri ===
The student union funds the student union magazine Visiiri. Visiiri's printed media publishes six times per year and it has a website, as well.

=== Biggest Wappu in Finland ===
Due to its large size, TREY is the organizer of Finland biggest vappu celebration (May 1 celebration for students) with over 100 events spanning for over two weeks.
