= Jatiya Party (Ershad) =

Political party in Bangladesh

Jatiya Party জাতীয় পার্টি
- Abbreviation: JaPa (official); JP(E) (customary)
- Chairman: Ghulam Muhammad Quader (Note: GM Quader is the legally recognized leader of the party. The leadership is disputed among Quader, Raushan Ershad, and Anisul Islam Mahmud.)
- General Secretary: Shamim Haider Patwary (Note: Shamim Patwary is the legally recognized general secretary of the party. The general secretaryship is disputed among Patwary (Quader faction), Kazi Mamunur Rashid (Raushan faction), and A.B.M. Ruhul Amin Howlader (Anisul faction).)
- Founder: Hussain Muhammad Ershad
- Founded: 1 January 1986; 40 years ago
- Headquarters: 66, Pioneer Road, Kakrail, Dhaka
- Student wing: Jatiya Chhatra Samaj
- Youth wing: Jatiya Jubo Sanghoti; Jatiya Tarun Party
- Women's wing: Jatiya Mohila Party; Jatiyo Jubo Mohila Party
- Peasants' wing: Jatiya Krishok Party
- Volunteer wing: Jatiyo Sechhasebak Party
- Cleric wing: Jatiya Olama Party
- Worker wing: Jatiya Sramik Party
- Ideology: Conservatism (Bangladeshi) Bangladeshi nationalism
- Political position: Centre-right
- National affiliation: National Democratic Front (Note: The Anisul faction only) (2025–present) Former: Grand Alliance (2018-19); Four Party Alliance (1999–2001, 2003–12); Islami Jatiya Oikya Front (2001–03)
- Colors: Yellow
- House of the Nation: 0 / 300
- Mayors: 0 / 1 (Note: Except Chattogram, mayoral post has been dissolved in all other city corporations of the country)
- Councillors: Post dissolved
- District councils: Post dissolved
- Subdistrict councils: Post dissolved
- Union councils: Post dissolved
- Municipalities: Post dissolved

Election symbol
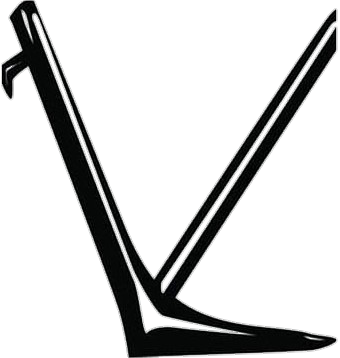
- Plough

Party flag

Website
- jatiyaparty.org.bd

The Jatiya Party (Bengali: জাতীয় পার্টি, romanized: Jatiyo Party, lit. 'National Party'), JaPa or JP(E), is a political party in Bangladesh. It was founded on 1 January 1986 by then Bangladeshi president Hussain Muhammad Ershad. The party was the ruling party of the country between 1986 and 1990.

Following the 1985 Bangladeshi military rule referendum, Ershad established the party as a civilian platform to support his military presidency. Within two years, it won two parliamentary elections, though both were widely regarded as flawed. After Ershad's removal in the 1990 mass uprising, the party was unable to regain electoral dominance but joined coalition governments on several occasions with the Awami League. Following the 2014 election, it played a dual role by serving both as the parliamentary opposition and as a participant in the ruling Awami League coalition cabinet, leading to its characterization as a "domesticated opposition". In subsequent elections under Sheikh Hasina, boycotted by other major opposition parties, the Jatiya Party continued to serve as the opposition in parliament. After Hasina's fall from power, some groups called for banning the party due to its past cooperation with her government.

Over time, the party has faced repeated divisions, and the registered Jatiya Party–JaPa now operates under two rival factions: one led by GM Quader with Shamim Haider Patwary, and the other by Anisul Islam Mahmud with A.B.M. Ruhul Amin Howlader as secretary general.

== History ==
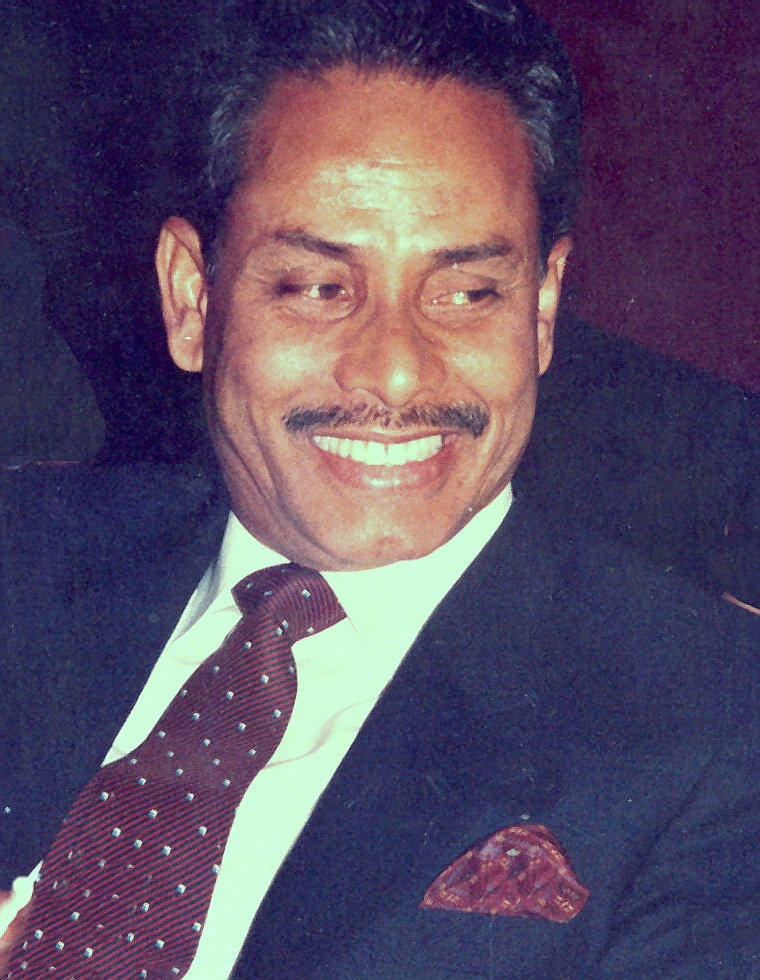
President Hussain Muhammad Ershad, the founder of the party

The party was established by military ruler, Hussain Muhammad Ershad on 1 January 1986. He was the Chief of Army Staff of Bangladesh Army. He had seized power through a coup d'état on 24 March 1982. He ruled the country as its chief martial law administrator. Politics was banned during the state of emergency imposed by Ershad, when Justice A. F. M. Ahsanuddin Chowdhury was appointed President of Bangladesh. The Janadal Party was formed under the leadership of A. F. M. Ahsanuddin Chowdhury, through Ershad's declaration of the 19-point programme on 17 March 1983.

Chowdhury announced the formation of Janadal on 27 November 1983. Chowdhury was the convenor and MA Matin as general secretary. When Ershad became president, Mizanur Rahman Chowdhury, the leader of Awami League (Mizan), was named chairman and Riazuddin Ahmed (also known as Bhola Mia, in his area) the general secretary. Ershad formed a second political party, Jatiya Front, under the politician of Bangladesh Nationalist Party (Azizur), Shah Azizur Rahman, with members of Janadal and Bangladesh Muslim League, the Ganatantri Dal, United Peoples' Party. Moudud Ahmed, and Anwar Hossain Manju joined Jatiya Front. The front was dissolved in six months and a new political party called Jatiya Party was formed on 1 January 1986 with Ershad as its chairman.

On 7 May 1986 elections, the Jatiya Party won 153 seats in the national elections. The election was viewed as neither neutral nor fair. On 15 October 1986, Ershad was elected as President of Bangladesh. Protests for democracy gained momentum in 1987. Consequently, Ershad dissolved the Jatiya Sangsad on 6 December 1987. In the elections for the fourth Jatiya Sangsad held on 3 March 1988, the Jatiya Party secured 251 seats, while other major political parties, including the Bangladesh Nationalist Party and the Awami League, boycotted the election. Ershad resigned in December 1990 in the face of rising protests and international pressure.

Ershad handed power over to Justice Shahabuddin Ahmed, on 6 December. Ershad was arrested, and his deputy, Mizanur Rahman Chowdhury became the acting chairman. On 27 February 1991, national election, the Jatiya Party won the third largest number of seats, 35 seats in the parliament. Jatiya Party won 32 seats in the parliamentary elections held on 12 June 1996 under the caretaker government (CTG). Jatiya Party joined the Bangladesh Awami League-led cabinet. Anwar Hossain Manju, the secretary general of Jatiya, was included in the cabinet of Sheikh Hasina as Minister of Communication. Jatiya party splintered in three groups by 2000, this fraction was led by General Ershad, another led by Anwar Hossain Manju and Bangladesh Jatiya Party led by Naziur Rahman Manzur. In the 2001 parliamentary election, the fraction led by Ershad won 14 seats, while the fraction led by Anwar Hossain won one seat. 2014 election was a controversial election for Jatiya Party where Ershad's then spokesperson Bobby Hajjaj publicly declared that Jatiya Party would not participate in the election. After the 2014 election, Ershad became the special envoy of Prime Minister Sheikh Hasina in the Bangladesh Awami League-led government. Jatiya Party became the opposition party and Rowshan Ershad, Ershad's wife, became the leader of the opposition. Despite being a opposition party, some leaders of Jatiya Party were also in the government cabinet. In January 2016, Ershad's brother, GM Quader, was made vice chairman of the party. In April 2016, Ershad appointed Rowshan as the vice-chairman of the party. In March 2017, Ershad indicated he might form a new political alliance with 14 other parties. For the next general election however, the Jatiya Party under HM Ershad formed a 58 party grand alliance of its own. Of the 58 parties, only Jatiya Party and Bangladesh Islamic Front have registration with the election commission as of 2017.

In early July 2024, Chhatra Samaj and Jatiyo Party expressed support for the 2024 Bangladesh quota reform movement and condemned attacks and harassment on student protestors by Chhatra League and Awami League. GM Quader in July 2024 stated that the quota movement was legitimate and logical.

On 31 October 2024, a group of protesters under the banner of "Anti-Fascism Student, Worker, and People's Movement" vandalised and burned down the central office of Jatiya Party in Bijoynagar, Dhaka.

In the 2026 Bangladeshi general election, the party did not win any seat after fielding a total of 195 candidates. It received 6,62,428 votes.

== Election results ==
=== Presidential elections ===
Election	Party candidate	Votes	%	Result
1985 (referendum)	Hussain Muhammad Ershad	32,661,233	94.5%	Elected ✓
1986	Hussain Muhammad Ershad	21,795,337	84.1%	Elected ✓

=== Jatiya Sangsad elections ===
Election	Party leader	Votes	%	Seats	+/–	Position	Government
1986	Hussain Muhammad Ershad	12,079,259	42.34%	153 / 300	New	▲1st	Government
1988	Hussain Muhammad Ershad	17,680,133	68.44%	251 / 300	▲98	1st	Government
1991	Hussain Muhammad Ershad	4,063,537	11.92%	35 / 300	▼216	▼4th	Opposition
Feb 1996	Hussain Muhammad Ershad	Boycotted		0 / 300	▼35	—N/a	Extra-parliamentary
Jun 1996	Hussain Muhammad Ershad	6,954,981	16.40%	32 / 300	▲32	▲3rd	Coalition Government
2001 (Note: Ran as part of the Islami Jatiya Oikya Front.)	Hussain Muhammad Ershad	4,038,453	7.25%	14 / 300	▼18	3rd	Opposition
2008	Hussain Muhammad Ershad	4,926,360	7.04%	27 / 300	▲13	3rd	Coalition Government
2014	Rowshan Ershad	1,199,727	7.00%	34 / 300	▲7	▲2nd	Coalition Government
2018	Hussain Muhammad Ershad	4,443,351	5.22%	26 / 300	▼8	2nd	Coalition Government
2024	GM Quader	2,179,673	4.33%	11 / 300	▼15	2nd	Opposition
2026	GM Quader	662,428	0.89%	0 / 300	▼11	—N/a	Extra-parliamentary

== See also ==
- Grand Alliance (Bangladesh)
- Jatiya Party (Manju)
- Bangladesh Jatiya Party
