= Motivate Canada =

Canadian non-profit organization

- Abbreviation: MC
- Formation: 1994
- Type: youth organization based in Canada
- Legal status: active
- Purpose: advocate and public voice, educator and network
- Headquarters: Ottawa, Ontario, Canada
- Region served: Canada
- Official language: English, French
- Website: www.motivatecanada.ca

Motivate Canada is a Canadian non-profit organization that empowers youth through sports and recreation. The organization is based in Ottawa, with offices in Toronto and Winnipeg. Motivate Canada's approach is based on youth-driven development. This theory assumes that not only is there a bias against youth initiative throughout the world, but removing this bias can have powerful effects on community development. Motivate Canada works with both Aboriginal and non-Aboriginal Canadian youth to develop their desire and capacity to follow their dreams. Some of the tools used include role-models, leadership and confidence-building, and medium to long-term community support.

== Esteem Team ==
The earliest Motivate Canada program was the Esteem Team , created in 1994 by Olympic wrestler Chris Wilson. Wilson wanted to inspire young Canadians to follow their dreams and gave motivational presentations in elementary and high-schools throughout British Columbia. In 2001, he was joined by Field Hockey Olympian Ian Bird (field hockey) and World Soke Cup Karate Champion Lisa Ling. Today, the ESTEEM Team counts dozens of Athletes Role Models engaging youth throughout Canada including: Alisha Tatham Brampton, Ontario - Team Canada Basketball, Amber Konikow - Sudbury, Ontario - National Boxing Champion, Kent Brown Winnipeg Manitoba, National Team Boxer, Corey Robinson - Halifax Nova Scotia, National Team Wrestler, Mark Hatfield - Ottawa, Ontario CIS, CFL & NFL Football, Darin Kyle - Ottawa, Ontario World Dance Champion, Benoit St-Amand - Montreal Quebec, Paralympic Gold Medalist, Sledge Hockey, Brian Nugent, Isabelle Turcotte Baird, Claire Carver-Dias, Olympic Bronze Medalist, Graeme Murray, Rob Cox, Chelsea Lariviere, Josh Vander Vies, Jennifer Joyce - Kamloops British Columbiam, National Team, Athletics (Hammer Throw), Kieran Block - Edmonton, Alberta, Team Canada Sledge Hockey, Keely Brown - Edmonton, Alberta, Team Canada Ringette, Cheryl Bernard- Calgary, Alerbta, Olympic Silver Medalist Curling, Kia Byers - Saskatoon, Saskatchewan National Team Canoe/Kayak, Mike Jones - Squamish, British Columbia, National Team Mountain Bike Adam Kreek - Victoria, British Columbia Olympic Gold Medalist - Rowing, Cheryl Pounder - Mississauga, Ontario, Olympic Gold Medalist - Ice Hockey, Dave Durepos - Fredericton, New Brunswick - Paralympic Gold Medalist, Wheel Chair Basketball

== GEN7 ==
The GEN7 program follows a similar role-model philosophy. It was created in 2002 in order to enable Aboriginal youth having achieved academic or athletic success to encourage other Aboriginal youth. The Aboriginal role-models, also called Messengers, make a total of 6 visits to an Aboriginal community. During these visits, they lead sports and self-esteem building workshops and share their stories. There are 16 active GEN7 Messengers working in communities across Canada. Current GEN7 Messengers are of First Nations, Inuit and Métis heritage and include Josh Sacobie, former University of Ottawa Gee Gees quarterback, World Championship female boxer Mary Spencer, Canadian National Championship boxer Kent Brown, Estonion National Hockey Team hopeful Michael Auksi.

== ACTIVATE ==
The ACTIVATE program was created in order to empower youth to drive their own physical activity projects in their communities through Youth Driven Development (YDD). The ACTIVATE Program consists of leadership training opportunities including the ACTIVATE National Youth Leadership Conference and ACTIVATE Regional Forums. After participating, ACTIVATORS plan and implement their projects, which usually focus on community sports, with the support of Motivate Canada staff members.

== Active Circle ==
The Active Circle is the newest Motivate Canada program. It was launched in 2008 in partnership with the Aboriginal Sports Circle and supports Aboriginal youth and communities to become vibrant, active and healthy through sport and recreation. The program supports community-driven physical activity initiatives and launched a website to serve as a hub for Aboriginal sports and recreation in Canada.
