= Young Scientists of Australia =

Australian not-for-profit organisation

The Young Scientists of Australia
- Company type: Other Incorporated Entity
- Genre: Science Communication
- Headquarters: Australia
- Number of locations: Brisbane, Sydney, Melbourne, Adelaide
- Website: http://www.ysa.org.au/

The Young Scientists of Australia is a collection of not-for-profit organisations dedicated to the promotion of science in Australia to the 14-25 year old demographic. The chapters are located in Adelaide, Brisbane, Melbourne, and Sydney and are run independently.

== Operations ==
The chapters' primary operations are organising science shows and workshops. These target high school students, primary school students and the general public, and vary from hour-long activities to the three-day Santos Science Experience. Events are often run in partnership with universities, schools, museums, not-for-profits and corporate entities, by volunteers. Each chapter organises social events for its members. Popular socials include beach walks, Easter Egg hunts, Amazing Races, Game of Assassins and annual balls.

The National Conference is where members of each committee come together to discuss each chapter's challenges and opportunities, and to provide direction for YSA as a body. The conference is held annually and runs for two to three days.

== Chapters ==
=== YSA Adelaide ===
YSA Adelaide is the most recently founded chapter, with its inaugural meeting occurring in December 2009.

Major events include:

- Science Alive at the Adelaide Show Grounds in August;
- National Science Week Events; and
- The Santos Science Experience at South Australian Universities.

The YSA Adelaide Chapter has a strong focus on outreach to school children and runs library workshops and school workshops, as well as science-themed socials and education and training.

Website: http://ysa.org.au/adelaide.

=== YSA Brisbane ===
YSA Brisbane is the founding chapter of YSA and in turn the oldest chapter in Australia. It was founded in 1991 after a group of excited youths attended the National Youth Science Forum (NYSF) program in Canberra and decided to form a club afterwards to remain in touch. The chapter has always had a heavy focus on science activities that provide volunteering opportunities for its members.

Yearly events include:

- Helping out at local Science and Engineering Challenges;
- Running activities at the World Science Festival in Brisbane;
- Attending Griffith and University of Queensland Open Days;
- Attending events throughout National Science Week, like at the Queensland Museum; and
- Annual training weekends.

It runs monthly socials for its members. Notable socials have included:

- Visits to various rock climbing, ice skating and bounce/inflatable venues;
- Various themed Grand Balls;
- The annual Newbies Welcome BBQ; and
- The annual Christmas trivia.

YSA Brisbane provides staff to three 'The Santos Science Experiences'. These include the January UQ program, the Griffith, UQ and QUT combined programs as well as the September Gold Coast program.

=== YSA Melbourne ===
YSA Melbourne was founded in 1991 and has been offering social events, professional development workshops, and staffing opportunities to those with an interest, curiosity, and/or passion of science ever since.

Major events and activities include:

- The Santos Science Experience at Federation University, Swinburne University, The University of Melbourne, and Knox Innovation, Opportunity and Sustainability Centre;
- Volunteering opportunities within programs run by the Australian and New Zealand Association for the Advancement of Science and Monash University; and
- National Science Week initiatives in collaboration with the Commonwealth Scientific and Industrial Research Organisation.

It also produces cross-platform science communication content and creates custom-designed science support programs for high schools and universities to engage a wider audience in science and encourage students to study STEM.

Website: http://melbourne.ysa.org.au.

=== YSA Sydney ===
YSA Sydney runs Science Shows and workshops for audiences ranging from primary school students, to tertiary students, to the general public. The chapter also provides volunteers for science outreach events organised by partner organisations. The chapter focuses its operations within Sydney but has run events in Wollongong.

Major events include:

- Science Schools: The Santos Science Experience and the Gifted and Talented Program, both headed by the University of Sydney;
- YSA Sydney's own annual Presentation and Science Show Training (PaSST) program; and
- The socials program for the biennial Professor Harry Messel International Science School (ISS).

== Past Chapters ==
- Perth.
