= A. J. E. F. =

Latin American and US Freemasonry appendant body

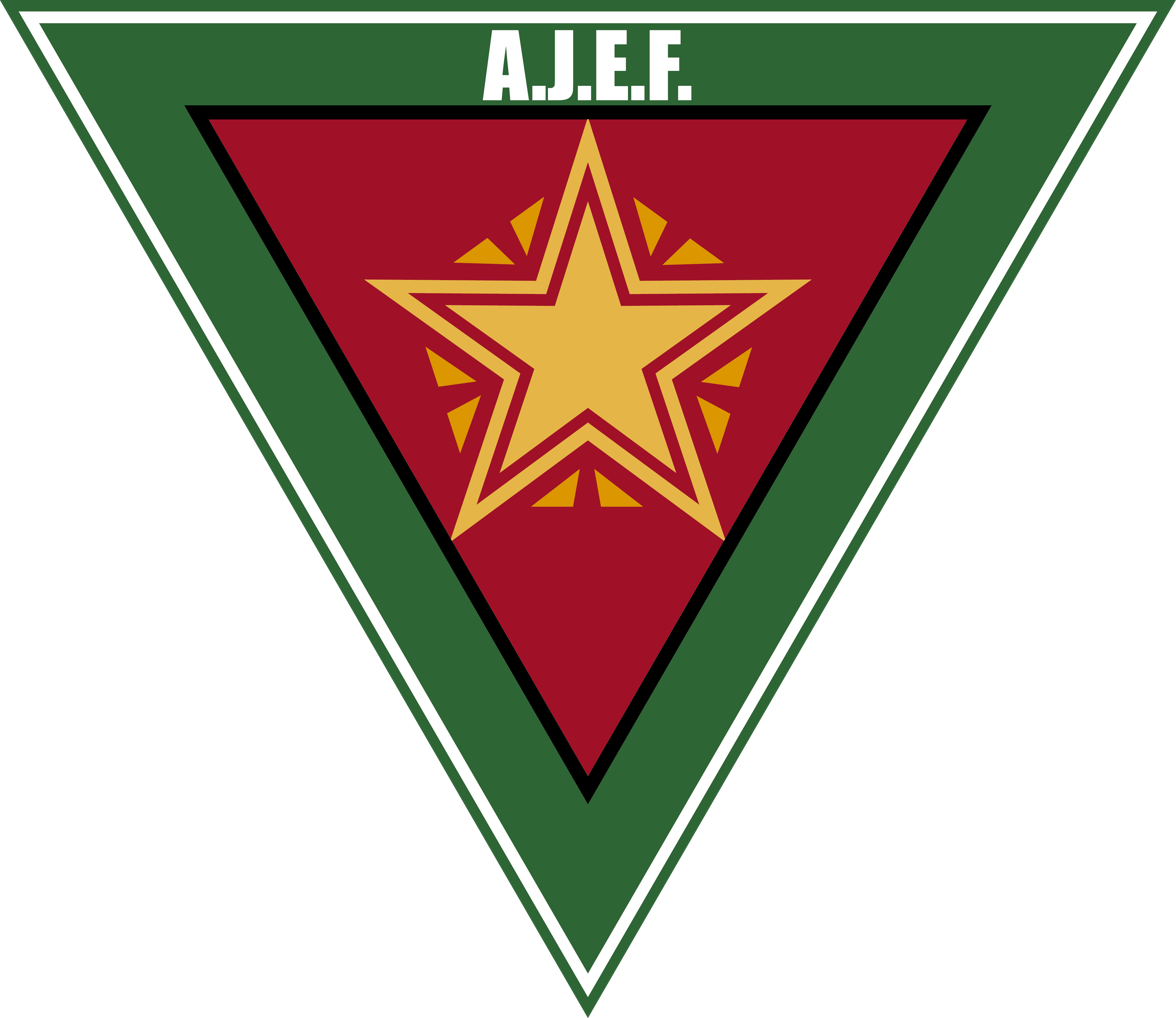
AJEF logo

A. J. E. F. or Asociación de Jóvenes Esperanza de la Fraternidad (Association of Youth Hope of the Fraternity) is an appendant body to Freemasonry for youth aged 14–21 in Cuba, México, and Latin America.

Initially its local organizations were named Lodges (Logias AJEF), but have been renamed as Talleres (workshops) in order to emphasize that A.J.E.F. is not Masonry, but an appendant body. Each Taller is sponsored by a Masonic Lodge, in both economic and moral support.

It is similar in focus and function to the Order of DeMolay, albeit with stronger ties to Freemasonry.

== Structural organization ==
Originally there was a body named "Consejo Central AJEF" (AJEF Central Council) as a superior body that supervised and organized, and it was conformed by active members of the A.J.E.F. In Mexico, there are not many Central Councils, though they still exist in Tamaulipas and Chiapas.

Every Chapter depends directly from its Lodge and Grand Lodge dispositions, but in order to maintain communication and fraternal working there are many events promoting fraternal activities. Almost every Grand Lodge in Mexico promotes the A.J.E.F. This is uncommon in the United States and in some other Latin American countries.

== History ==
A.J.E.F. was founded in Havana, Cuba on February 9, 1936, by Fernando Suárez Núñez (May 7, 1882–Jan. 24 1946). The first lodge was called "Esperanza" (Hope).

Reaching 5,000 members by 1938, its rapid growth began to foster chapters overseas.

In 1939 the first Mexican A.J.E.F. Lodge, named after Benito Juárez, was established by the United Mexican Grand Lodge of Veracruz (Gran Logia "Unida Mexicana") due to the influence and motivation of Martin Dihigo Llanos. The second one was established at Mexico City, by the Mexican Valley Grand Lodge (Gran Logia "Valle de México") and its name was "Fernando Suárez Núñez".

== Mystique and rituals ==
The original ritual was created by its Cuban founder Fernando Suárez Núñez.

In Mexico the Regular Grand Lodges of the United States of Mexico Confederation (Confederación de Grandes Logias Regulares de la República Mexicana) assigned the Mexican Valley Grand Lodge (Gran Logia "Valle de México") to adapt the ritual for the Mexican youth; but in 1991 the United Mexican Grand Lodge of Veracruz (Gran Logia Unida Mexicana) created the "Vademécum del AJEF", the first compilation of ceremonials and the AJEF Theory - symbols and philosophic principles. Because of that it is the basis for the subsequent documents elaborated by other Grand Lodges, as the "Prontuario del AJEF", created in 1994 by the Grand Lodge Valle de México.

The rituals that constitute the exercise of "Ajefismo" are aimed at developing moral values and social skills among the initiates.

The Letters A.J.E.F. have in themselves a deeper meaning, as these are the letters of the "fundamental words" Love, Justice, Hope and Fraternity (Amor, Justicia, Esperanza y Fraternidad).

The institution's motto, always at the bottom of essays and official papers, is "For the nation and humanity" (Por la patria y la humanidad).
