= AER Youth Regional Network =

Logo of the AER Youth Regional Network

Created by the Assembly of European Regions (AER), the Youth Regional Network (YRN) is a platform of regional-level youth organisations, councils and parliaments from across wider Europe. The platform works as a forum where young people can influence regional and European policy while exchanging experiences and good practice. At the general Assembly in Brussels on 10 March 2023, YRN members elected their presidium, which is composed as follow:

- YRN President: Jim Simonsen Jenssen (Nordland, NO)
- Vice-President, Anette Amalie Bang (Nordland, NO)
- Vice-President, Norbert Nagy (Salaj, RO)
- Chair of the TC on Youth Participation & Governance: Sigrun Myrvang (Innlandet, NO)
- Chair of the TC on Mental Health & Wellbeing: Daria Sustrietova (Kirovohrad, UA)
- Chair of the TC on Gender Equality & Women Empowerment: Maylinda Bajrami (Tirana, AL)

== Background ==
AER's Youth Regional Network was established on 25 November 2008 in Wiesbaden (Hessen region, Germany), where a founding meeting of ninety young people representing 55 European regions launched Europe's first platform of regional youth councils, parliaments and organisations. They adopted the Wiesbaden Resolution, in order to define their main priorities and goals.

The YRN was founded on the idea that decision-making should be based upon the principle of subsidiarity. This means that, on the one hand, youth policy at European level should reflect the diversity of the regions and of the young people that live in those regions. On the other hand, youth policy within the regions should maintain a European dimension so that the common challenges faced by all young people can be tackled in co-operation with the sharing of ideas, knowledge and experiences.

2010 In order to ensure that YRN functions as a genuine platform linking regional youth Councils/parliaments/NGOs with AER and its activities, the AER General Assembly agrees to adopt the Declaration on Enhanced Cooperation with YRN, which marks the recognition of its role and commitment within AER, among AER member regions & at the European level.

2013 YRN adopted its statutes, rule of procedures and strategic priorities. From May 2013, YRN got a seat in the AER Executive Board.

== Mission ==
The mission of the YRN is to provide young people the opportunity to exchange views with other young people in order to get them more involved at the European and regional democratic processes.

== Objectives ==
There YRN has four main objectives: networking, influencing policy, exchanging best practice and experience and promoting sustainable governance.
