= European Geology Students Network =

Geo-science youth organisation

European Geosciences Students Network (EUGEN) is youth organization based in Germany. Main goal of EUGEN is organizing annual summer camps for students in geo-sciences all across Europe. The EUGEN was created in summer 1995 during the national meeting of German geology students. First summer camp was held in August 1996 in Black Forest in Germany with participation of 120 students from 18 European universities. Since then every August is held EUGEN meeting every time on different location in Europe and last for one whole week. The program schedule usually contains three days reserved for geological fieldtrips, organized by the local hosts (students of geology) in league with their university professors and/or national geological survey. One day is reserved for some sightseeing-trips to interesting local destinations. Talks and presentations from members of participating universities and supporting organizations are also part of the program. The tradition calls for one afternoon dedicated to the famous Geolympix - a team competition in highly entertainable fun-sport games. On every EUGEN meeting the contest for next EUGEN meetings are held. The countries that nominate themselves make presentations and participants vote for the winner. The most recent EUGEN meeting took place near Kavala, Greece.

== List of EUGEN meetings ==
- 1996: Schwarzwald, Germany
- 1997: Aveiro, Portugal
- 1998: Transylvania, Romania
- 1999: Sicily, Italy
- 2000: Sierra del Moncayo, Spain
- 2001: Platelai, Lithuania
- 2002: Eifel, Germany
- 2003: Kobarid, Slovenia
- 2004: Buses, Latvia
- 2005: Lokve, Croatia
- 2006: Braganca, Portugal
- 2007: Cantiano, Italy
- 2008: Reichenau/Tamins, Switzerland
- 2009: Someren, Netherlands
- 2010: Gjiri i Lalzit, Albania
- 2011: Duburys lake, Lithuania
- 2012: Harz Mountains, Germany
- 2013: Calabria, Italy
- 2014: Komen, Slovenia
- 2015: Stryszów, Poland
- 2016: Kinrooi, Belgium
- 2017: Karlovac, Croatia
- 2018: Carinthia, Austria
- 2019: Alytus, Lithuania
- 2023: Ljubno ob Savinji, Slovenia
- 2024: Sisteron, France
- 2025: Ochaby, Poland
- 2026: Kavala, Greece
