= Association of Bangladesh-China Alumni =

- Abbreviation: ABCA
- Formation: 2021
- Type: Non-profit organization
- Headquarters: Dhaka, Bangladesh
- Location: Bangladesh
- Members: Bangladeshi alumni
- President: Munshi Faiz Ahmad
- General Secretary: Dr. Md. Shahabul Haque
- Website: abc-alumni.org

The Association of Bangladesh-China Alumni or simply ABCA (Bengali: অ্যাসোসিয়েশন অব বাংলাদেশ চায়না-অ্যালামনাই) is a Bangladesh-based non-profit organization for Bangladeshis who have studied, worked, or trained in China. Founded in 2021, ABCA hosts cultural and networking events and offers professional development activities for its members. In 2024, the Chinese Embassy in Dhaka awarded the Association of Bangladesh-China Alumni (ABCA) with the Outstanding Promotional Partner Award in recognition of its work promoting bilateral relations.

== History ==
The Association of Bangladesh China Alumni (ABCA) was founded to bring together Bangladeshi individuals who have undertaken academic, professional, or training programs in China. In late 2020, an 18‑member preparatory committee was formed, and an online launch meeting took place on 30 December 2020 with participation from representatives of the Chinese Embassy in Dhaka. ABCA announced its first executive board for 2021–2023 on 12 July 2021, and the executive committee was installed in October 2021 during a webinar on poverty reduction.

== Activities ==
ABCA organizes events and programs related to Bangladesh-China relations, education, and business. The association has supported poverty alleviation efforts and initiatives encouraging overseas students to return for opportunities in Chinese firms. Its regular activities include:

- Events and Celebrations: Organizes Chinese New Year celebrations in collaboration with the Chinese Embassy, Independence Day of Bangladesh events, and art exhibition.
- Community and Social Work: In collaboration with the Chinese embassy, provides food and aid to flood-affected people in Bangladesh, and distributes winter blankets.
- Cultural Exchanges: Organizes cultural events and publishes materials, including hosting webinars on topics such as historical figures.
- Iftar celebration: Hosts an Iftar party during the month of Ramadan.
- Professional Development: Facilitates career opportunities, maintains alumni directories, and partners with organizations on study abroad programs.

== See also ==
- Bangladesh–China relations
- Bangladesh China Friendship Conference Center
- Bangladesh–China Friendship Exhibition Center
