= Our Youth Social Community =

Non governmental organization in India

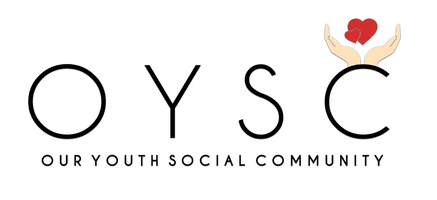
- Abbreviation: OYSC
- Type: Nonprofit
- Headquarters: Vijayawada, Andhra Pradesh
- Website: https://oysc.in/

Our Youth Social Community (OYSC) is a non-profit organization headquartered in Andhra Pradesh, India. It has operated several charitable campaigns, including one in 2021 to distribute menstrual supplies to women and girls with limited access to them.

The organization was started in Vijayawada. Its initial campaigns distributed food packets to marginalized people and COVID safety supplies to drivers. In 2021 it conducted a campaign to spread awareness about menstrual hygiene and distribute menstrual supplies.

Initially, the members bought sanitary pads made by popular brands in bulk to distribute to girls and women with limited access. Recognizing that store-bought sanitary pads are non-biodegradable and harmful due to that, they came up with the idea of producing sanitary pads made of 100 percent biodegradable materials. The NGO started producing a three-layered sanitary pad made up of biodegradable materials such as bamboo, banana fiber, and corn starch plastic.
