= Jatiya Jubo Sanghoti =

Youth solidarity wing of Jatiya Party (Ershad)

Jatiya Jubo Sanghoti জাতীয় যুব সংহতি
- Logo
- Founded: April 2, 1983; 42 years ago
- Headquarters: 66, Pioneer Road, Kakrail, Dhaka-1205
- Ideology: Conservatism (Bangladesh) Bangladeshi nationalism
- Position: Centre
- National affiliation: Jatiya Party (Ershad)

Jatiya Jubo Sanghoti (Bengali: জাতীয় যুব সংহতি, lit. 'National Youth Solidarity') is the youth solidarity wing of the Jatiya Party (Ershad). It was established in 1983.

== History ==
On 2 April 1983, Chief Martial Law Administrator Hussain Muhammad Ershad established the Jatiyo Jubo Sanghoti as Ershad's vanguard in the name of Nationalism, Democracy and economic liberation. After its establishment in 1983, the first president of the group was Mia Mohammad Shaheed and the first convener was ATM Rafiq.

In August 2017, an 251-member full central committee of Jubo Sanghoti was approved.

In January 2021, the central convening committee of Jubo Sanghoti was declared.

In October 2021, committees of Narayanganj District and Narayanganj Metropolitan branch of Jubo Sanghoti were declared.

In June 2022, an 81-member convening committee of Barisal Metropolitan unit of Jubo Sanghoti was formed.

In March 2023, an exchange meeting of the group was held.

In May 2023, the full committee of Gazipur Sadar Upazila unit of Jubo Sanghoti was declared.

In June 2023, HM Shahriar Asif became the president of Jubo Sanghoti and Ahad U Chowdhury Shaheen became its general secretary.

On 2024, an 119-member convening committee of Rangpur Metropolitan branch of Jubo Sanghoti was approved by Jubo Sanghoti's central committee and the former committee was dissolved.
