= Students' Union (Turkey) =

Öğrenci-Sen
- Students' Union
- Öğrenci Sendikası
- Founded: 29 November 2019
- Headquarters: Decentralized
- Location: Turkey
- Members: Unknown
- Website: ogrencisendikasi.com

Students' Union (Öğrenci Sendikası), or simply Öğren-Sen, is a students' union that was founded on 29 November 2019 with the motto of "Let's save our future". It describes itself as a union that has the goal of confronting social and economic problems of students. These mainly concern topics such as dormitory debts, living expenses, de-qualification in education, future anxiety, careerism and exam stress. It is the second students' union in Turkey, following Genç-Sen, which was closed in 2011.

== History ==
Students' groups and communities that had spent their summer holiday for educational meetings and discussions have made a general call on 29 November 2019 for the foundation of Students' Union. After that, Turkey's second ever students' union "Öğrenci-Sen" is found.

== Activity ==
=== 'No Exam with Hunger' campaign ===
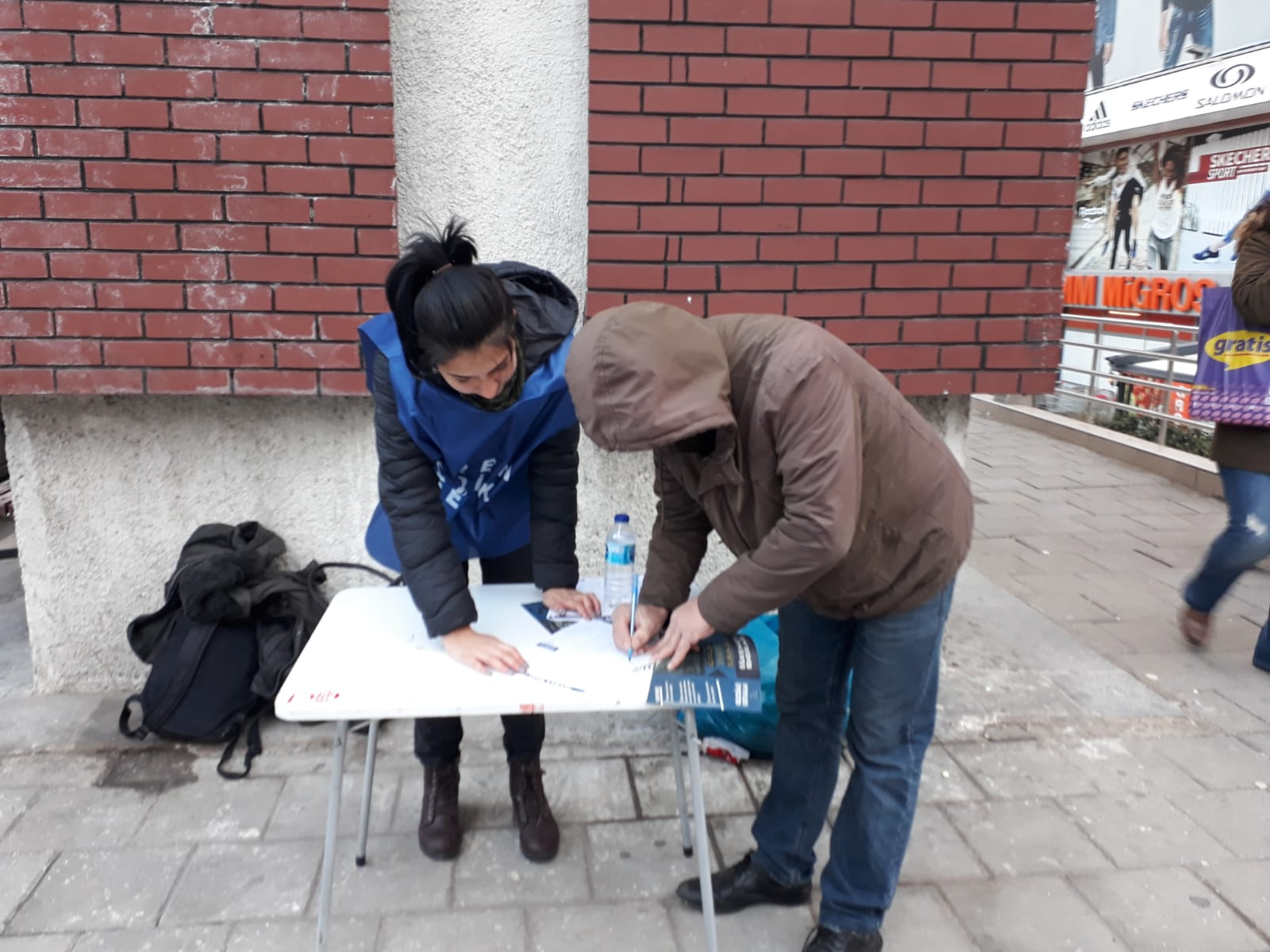
A shot from the street work of the 'No Exam With Hunger' campaign

The first campaign that Student's Union held is the 'No Exam with Hunger' campaign on 2 February 2020, against price rises made to dining hall and transportation. While raises were being made to university dining halls, high school canteens and transportation, the raise declared by Istanbul University caused a reaction countrywide. The protests that took place in the university got supported by opposition figures and intellectuals. While rectorate's stepping back on 6 January was a progress for students, the suicide of university student Sibel Ünli due to poverty and lack of livelihood caused indignation in the country.

Students' Union, after all of those events, started a signature campaign on 2 February 2020, via Change.org, against to life expenses of students. Union members that had started to open stands all over the country have asked for all dining expenses to be fixed to 1,5 TL. Students also demanded that municipalities should distribute soup in the mornings in front of the universities, withdrawing the raises made to transportation in Istanbul and fixation of such costs to an acceptable level in other cities.

=== COVID-19 pandemic and distance learning ===
After the COVID-19 pandemic starting in the country, while students were getting online education from EbaTV of primary, junior high and high school level, university students were getting the type of education their schools have decides themselves.

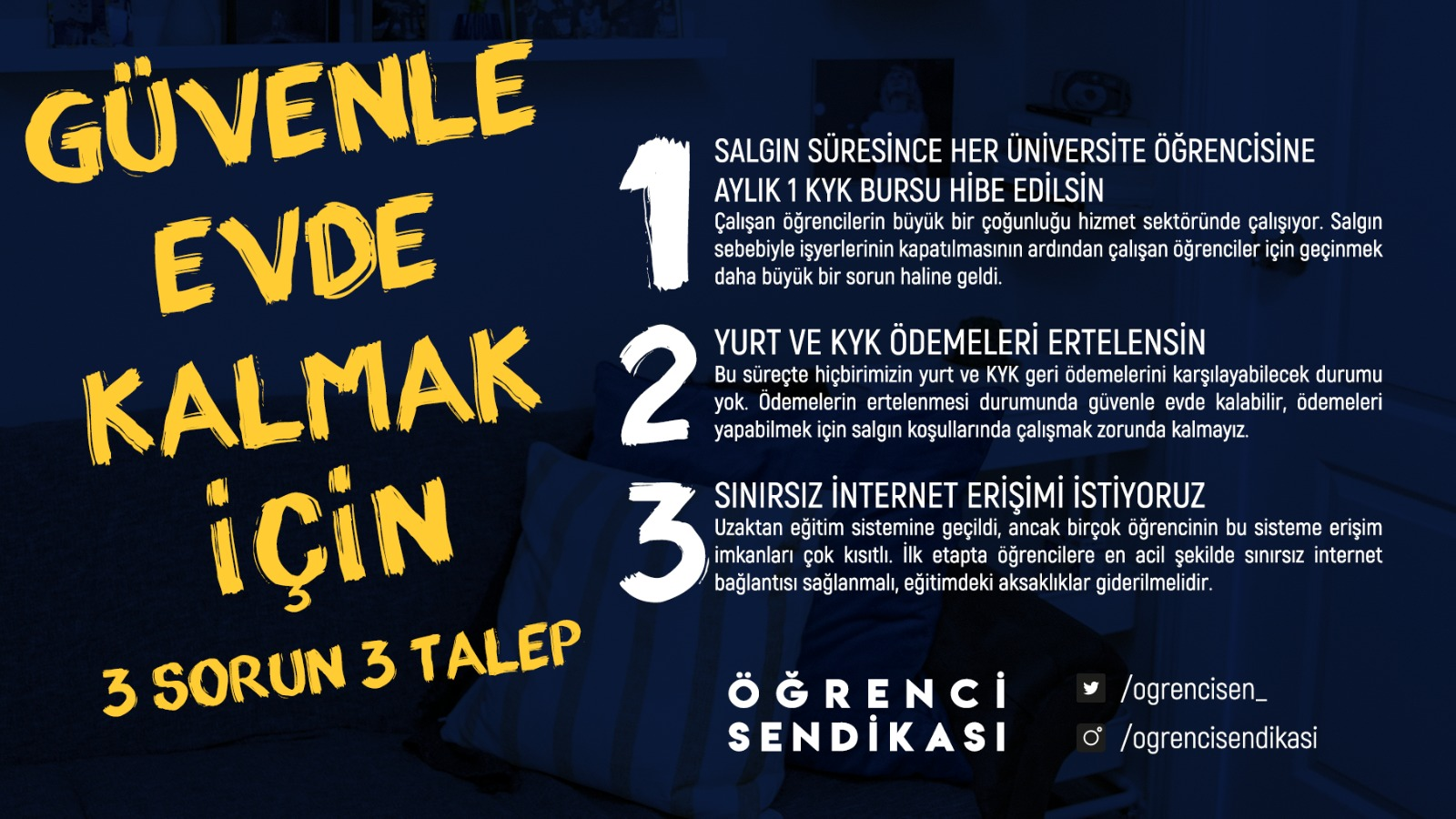
Students' Union's '3 Problems 3 Demands' directive for staying safe during COVID-19

The reaction of Students' Union about that was started with the closure of student dormitories by government. By that unplanned decision, the students were forced to return their homes, and were filled in bus terminals uncontrollably due to the lack of planning. At the same time, the arrival of people coming from foreign countries to the dormitories which were being used for quarantine was also among concerns.

Students' Union spread the decision of rectorate to close dormitories and demanded planning to related officials. Many rectorates starting with METU withdrew their decisions to some degree.

Students' Union committed several actions during the pandemic. Alongside of "stay home" calls, they have done statements about staying safe during COVID-19 and kept their protests regarding dormitory debts, free internet and helping students whose dormitory scholarship are cancelled.

== Recognition ==
Students' Union is recognized by Ministry of Family, Labour and Social Services of Republic of Turkey as a registered independent labor union with its own code.

== Structure ==
=== Organization of Union ===
- Administrative Bodies
  - A- HQ Bodies (Genel Merkez Organları)
    - a) General Board (Genel Kurul)
    - b) General Governing Board (Genel Yönetim Kurulu)
    - c) General Inspection Board (Genel Denetim Kurulu)
    - d) General Discipline Board (Genel Disiplin Kurulu)
  - B- Branch Bodies (Şube Organları)
    - a) Branch General Board (Şube Genel Kurulu)
    - b) Branch Governing Board (Şube Yönetim Kurulu)
    - c) Branch Inspection Board (Şube Denetim Kurulu)
    - d) General Discipline Board (Genel Disiplin Kurulu)
- Advisory Bodies (Danışma Organları)
  - a) Cabinet (Bakanlar Kurulu)
  - b) General Representatives' Board (Genel Temsilciler Kurulu)
  - c) Branch Representatives' Board (Şube Temsilciler Kurulu)

== See also ==
- Students' union
- Student rights in higher education
