= PQASSO =

PQASSO, the Practical Quality Assurance System for Small Organisations, is a performance evaluation system and quality mark for charitable organizations in the UK. Evaluations use a system of peer review between small charities. The system was created by Charities Evaluation Services, itself a registered UK charity.

Organizations being assessed as meeting a level of compliance with level 2 or above are eligible to carry an official stamp of endorsement by the UK Charity Commission demonstrating that the charity is well managed. PQASSO was re-endorsed by the Charity Commission in 2014.

There are 3 incremental levels of organizational maturity recognized by PQASSO (levels 1 to 3) and defined by a series of management indicators.

Over 100 UK charities currently have a published quality mark under the scheme.

The Improving Quality (IQ) scheme is a successor to the PQASSO scheme, developed by some of those originally involved in PQASSO and maintaining the same approach to quality evaluation.

== Sources ==
- Matthews, Sam; Services, Charities Evaluation (2008), PQASSO: Practical Quality Assurance System for Small Organisations (3 ed.), Charities Evaluation Services, ISBN 978-0-9555404-1-7
