= Youth United =

- Formation: 2006, incorporated on March 27, 2008
- Type: Income Tax Exempted Non Governmental Organization,
- Headquarters: Lucknow
- Location: Republic of India
- Official language: English, Hindi
- President: Arvind kumar
- Key people: Arvind kumar, Manish Kuma Verma; Saloni Bajaj, Jassimran Kaur, Aman Ahuja, Love Upadhyay, Parul Sood
- Website: www.youthunited.in

Youth United (Hindi: यूथ यूनाइटेड, Punjabi: ਯੂਥ ਯੂਨਾਇਟੇਡ, Kannada: ಯೂಥ್ಥ್ ಯುನೈಟೆಡ್, Marathi: यूथ युनैटेड) is an Indian Social Enterprise, Non-profit and Non Governmental Organization (NGO) working for the betterment of Animals with the operational chapters in Delhi, Patiala, Pune, Chennai, Bengaluru, Lucknow and Now headquarter in Lucknow. Youth United (earlier known as Youth 360) was founded in 2006, with Society welfare in view, by Jyotindra Nath, then a student of Panjab University, Chandigarh, India.

== Objectives ==
The objective of Youth United is to encourage and foster the development of the youth of India and hence the development of society as a whole through its activities like periodicals, events, community Services and online portals. Youth United initiate different projects and hence creates opportunities and fora for the individuals all over India to mobilize their skills and resources and to work together for various social issues.

== Legal status ==
Youth United is an Income Tax exempted Non Governmental Organization, registered under Article XXI of the Societies Registration Act of 1860, India and exempted from Income Tax under section 12A and 80G of Income Tax Act of 1961, India.

== Visionaries and founder members ==
Youth United was started as an oral organization, with Society welfare in view, by few students of Panjab University, Chandigarh, India. Jyotindra Nath, the founder of Youth United, with Rohan Aneja, Kunal Gulati, Saurabh Verma, Ritoban Chakrabarti, Saloni Bajaj, Neelima Walia, Sabiha Basur, Parul Sood, Aurobind Vidyarthi and Sukhmani Khanna founded the organization as an oral body in February, 2007. It was an oral body until February, 2008, when it became a registered Society, under the Indian Societies Registration Act of 1860, one of the three kind of Indian NGOs.

== Divisions ==
Youth United functioning is divided into 3 divisions:

1. United Colors of Youth (earlier YoU): The publication helps the organization to achieve its objectives by reaching students in different colleges, different streams with different mindsets, vivid talents etc. This publication provides a platform for these young minds to express their views, discuss their problems besides keeping them informed about the latest in career, fashion, technology, sports, entertainment.
2. Youth United Community Services: being the most prominent section of Youth United, takes up activities in the form of events, whatsoever may lead to the development of any form in any section of society, making the youth realize their responsibility towards society and country. Currently there are following wings of Youth United Community Services: Animal Welfare (Youth United for Animals), Advocacy, Women Emancipation, Girl Child, Children Welfare, Education, Poverty, Underprivileged population, Rural Welfare, Farmer Welfare, Anti-Terrorism, Drug De-addiction, Environment, Health Issues.
3. International Youth Portal: Youth United possess an International Youth Portal www.youthunited.in. The basic mission of this Youth Portal is to bring together the Youth of the world on a common platform and hence to work for the graduated effectuation of Youth United aims and objectives and hence for the development of Society.

== Projects ==
As the most prominent section of Youth United, Community Services department has organized various events, for the cause of various sections of the society in the past 2 years, primarily giving emphasis to the cause of Education, Poverty and Female Feticide through its flagship events Smiling Future Series and through its flagship project Youth United Mass Education and Awareness Mission (YUMEAM).
