= Arsalyn Program =

US non-profit foundation

The Arsalyn Program of Ludwick Family Foundation (formerly Arsalyn Foundation) is a small 501(c)(3) non-profit foundation in the United States headquartered in Glendora, California. It is dedicated to increasing youth civic engagement. It is categorized under Voter Education/Registration programs.

Arsalyn Program's mission statement:

The Arsalyn Program of Ludwick Family Foundation was created to encourage young Americans to become informed and active participants in the electoral process. The Arsalyn Program views the civic and political engagement of young people as beneficial to country, community and character. The Arsalyn Program is firmly committed to a non-partisan, non-issue-based and inclusive approach to ensure that voting become a lifetime commitment on the part of our nation's young adults.

== Speakers ==
Arsalyn Foundation hosts a variety of events, including town halls in Southern California and a national conference in Washington, D.C., with many different speakers. Previous speakers at events have included:

- Amy Alkon
- Peter Beinart, editor-at-large of The New Republic
- Andrei Cherny, a speechwriter for Vice president Al Gore
- Judy Chu
- Fenton Communications
- Martin Frost
- Nick Gillespie, former editor of Reason Magazine
- Jonah Goldberg, editor at large of National Review Online
- Amy Holmes
- Phil Huckelberry, co-chair of the Green Party (United States)
- John P. McConnell, a speechwriter for President George W. Bush
- William Powers, a journalist with Atlantic Monthly
- Eugene Robinson, journalist
- Matthew Scully
- Cathy Seipp
- Matt Welch, former assistant editorial page editor of the Los Angeles Times and current editor of Reason Magazine
