= CrossRoads Ministry =

Outreach ministry of St. William Church in Louisville, Kentucky

CrossRoads Ministry is an outreach ministry of St. William Church in Louisville, Kentucky that conducts urban retreats focused on social justice. The retreats are based on themes from the Gospel and Catholic Social Teaching. Since 2000, CrossRoads has hosted approximately 10,000 young people on its retreats.

== History ==
CrossRoads was established in 2000 as an outreach of St. William Church, a parish that identifies itself a "peacemaking community" in the spirit of Vatican Council II. CrossRoads was designed by the parish leaders to heavily involve youth members in its activism. After receiving a grant from the Sisters of Charity of Nazareth, CrossRoads hired Shannon Queenan as its first director in 2000, and began offering retreats for local high school and college students. Eventually, the organization would also offer adult retreats. In the year 2013, CrossRoads hosted 66 groups (about 1,400 participants).

== Retreats ==
CrossRoads is situated in West Louisville. The poverty rate in West Louisville is 42%, compared with a regional average of 12.4%. The retreat model takes participants, usually from other neighborhoods, to visit and interview people utilizing local social services. After these visits, participants return to the retreat center, where the retreat facilitators lead prayer and reflection.

CrossRoads has designed and implemented a number of different retreats, including "Footprints", a daylong retreat including a visit to a social service agency; "Follow Me", an overnight retreat including visits to 4 different social service agencies; "Send Down the Fire", which prepares Catholic groups for the sacrament of Confirmation; and "CrossWalk", a weeklong immersion experience in inner-city Louisville.

== Directors ==
- Shannon Queenan, 2000–2003
- Fritz Gutwein, 2003–2005
- Dawn Dones, 2006–2015
- Alex Flood, Retreat Director 2013–present
- Stephanie Kaufman, Mission Development Director 2016–present
