= Youth Leaders International =

- Leaders International
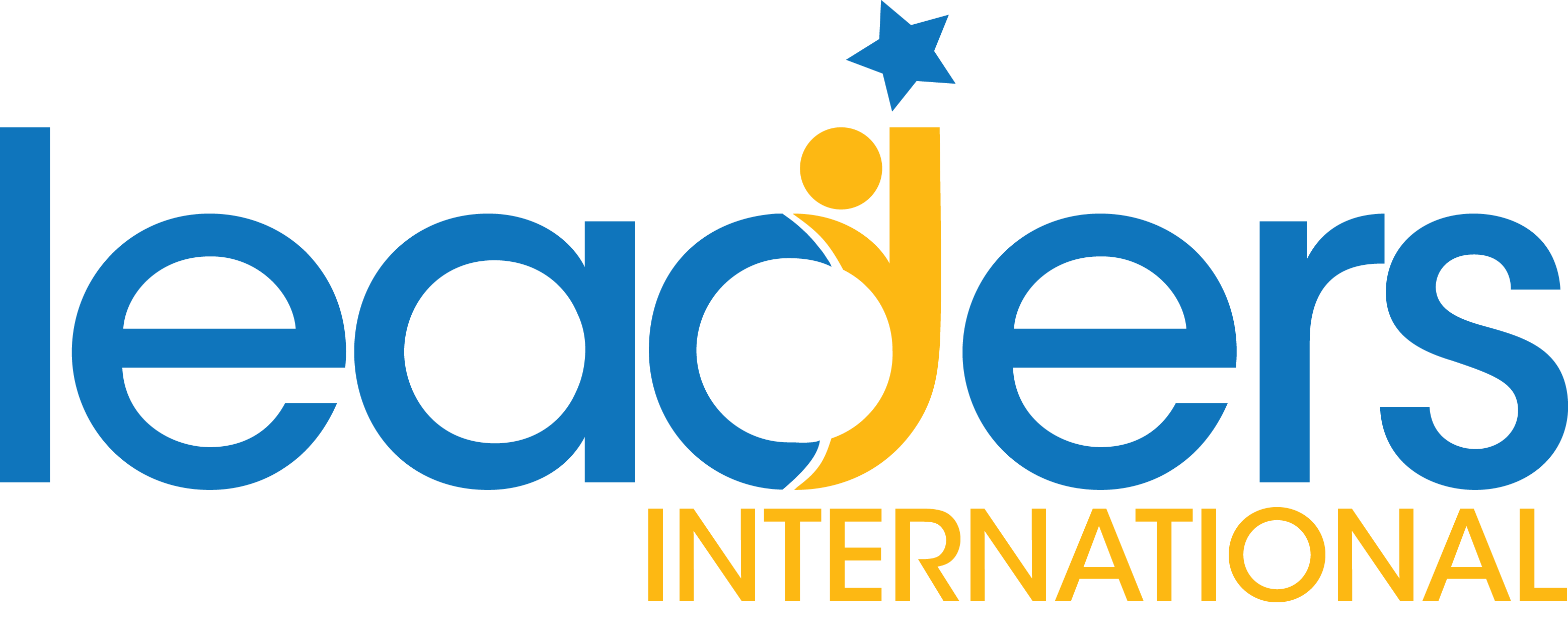
- Type: 501(c)(3) organization
- Website: www.leaders.org

Leaders International, formerly known as Youth Leaders International (YLI), is a nonprofit organization based in Spencerville, Maryland. It is now known by the abbreviation Leaders.

Leaders was founded in 1996 by Jerry Samet. It is headquartered in Spencerville, Maryland, US.

== Programs ==
Leaders has run programs taking place in June - August since 1997. In 1997 Leaders went to Ireland. In 2002 and 2003 at Leaders' World Leaders Conference, Leaders partnered with Workable Peace. In 2003, Leaders participated in Community Volunteer Day to Beautify DC Public Schools that was run by Service For Peace. In the summer of 2013, Leaders hosted the Leaders United Program in Washington DC. The program was focused on developing individual and team leadership skills, sustainability, globalization, and conflict resolution.

Some of the notable speakers Leaders has had are:

- Kathleen Kennedy Townsend
- Mo Mowlam
- John Putzier
- Joshua Piven & David Borgenicht
- Robert Holden
- Michael J. Gelb
- Mike Marriner & Nathan Gebhard
- Ilyce Glink
- Rita Emmett
- IRobot
- Peter Dixon
- Akram Elias
- Victoria Seitz
- Hans Scholl
- Jasmine Birtles
- Michael Hindley
- Jane Read
- Avril Carson

Leaders had a 2011 Global Leaders Program in Washington, D.C. July 23–30, 2011.

== Structure ==
Leaders International, headquartered in Maryland, is overseen by a board of directors, and is advised in educational matters by an education panel. Day-to-day activities are run by the leaders staff and the Youth Leaders International Foundation Staff, while programs are run by education professionals and leaders alumni.

== Board of directors ==
- Jerold Samet (chairman)
- Hon. David Ross (honorary chairman), commissioner of Office of Child Support Enforcement, US Dept of Health and Human Service, 1994–2001
- Dennis Cunanan, director general, Technology Resource Center for the Philippine Government
- Sherry Mueller, president emeritus of NCIV
- Alicia Rios, head of history, Markham College, Peru
- Sambia Shivers-Barclay, Coordinator of Sub-Saharan Affairs & International Visitors, United States Department of Education
- David Smyth, assistant principal, Melbourne High School, Australia
- Irena Krasteva, CEO of NBMG, Sofia, Bulgaria

== Leaders Education Panel ==
- Sambia Shivers-Barclay (chairwoman, YLI Education Panel), Coordinator of Sub-Saharan Affairs & International Visitors, United States Department of Education

== Chapters ==
Australia (Melbourne & Sydney)
Bosnia and Herzegovina (Sarajevo)
Canada (Montreal & Winnipeg)
China (Beijing)
Czech Republic (Prague)
Dominican Republic (Santo Domingo)
France (Paris & Noisy le Grand)
Greece
Honduras (Tegucigalpa)
Ireland (Dublin)
Israel (Haifa, Holon, Metulla, Lehavim, Modiin, Tel Aviv, Tirat-Carmel, Yavne)
Kenya (Nairobi)
Moldova (Chisinau)
Peru (Lima)
Philippines (Manila)
Romania (Bucharest & Turnu-Severin)
Russia (Moscow & Volgograd)
Turkey (Istanbul)
USA (Fosston MN, Minneapolis MN, Waterport NY, Kansas City MO, Silver Spring MD, Eastlake OH, Oakton VA)

== Name change ==
On May 14, 2013, the organization changed its name from Youth Leaders International to Leaders International, citing the desire for a simpler name, as well as to avoid the confusion that the term "youth" causes in different areas of the world. The organization also launched a new logo to go along with the new name.

The name Youth Leaders International also previously referred to the student community and Humans of High School Blog founded by Jessica Jiwon Choe in 2015. Since 2017, the organization changed its name to Worldwide Student Social and Worldwide Student Social Blog respectively. Worldwide Student Social (WWS) is composed of students all over the globe creating "a community to thrive in" by sharing common interests in the Worldwide Student Social Blog, submitting queries and answers in the Student Advice Column, and participating in speech/service opportunities that WWS showcases. As of 2017, WWS has brought together students from 25 schools in 5 countries and has accumulated over 8,000 hits on its WWS Blog.
