= Hip Hop 4 Life =

- Founded: 2003
- Founder: Tamekia Flowers
- Defunct: 2017
- Type: 501 c(3) not-for-profit
- Purpose: Engaging, educating and empowering young people to adopt a healthy lifestyle
- Location: New York City, United States
- Region served: New York and national United States
- Method: Educate young people on health issues through interactive workshops and empowerment seminars
- Key people: Tanisha Tate, Ianna A. Small
- Website: www.hiphop4lifeinc.org

Hip Hop 4 Life (Formerly Hip Hip 4 Health) was an American 501 c(3) not-for-profit organization educating young people to adopt a healthy lifestyle founded by Tamekia Flowers.

Health professionals, entertainers, celebrities and athletes were enlisted to educate young people on health issues through interactive workshops and empowerment seminars. Hip Hop 4 Life served young people aged 10–18, with a special emphasis on at risk and low income black youth. The organization was launched in 2003 and served over 15,000 young people before being closed down around 2017.
