= Remaja Islam Sunda Kelapa =

Islamic organization based in Jakarta, Indonesia

Remaja Islam Sunda Kelapa (RISKA) is an Islamic youth organization located in Jakarta, Indonesia. It was founded in 1974.

Since it was founded, RISKA has been a dynamic Islamic youth organization where youngsters who come to RISKA not only learn Islam but also can explore their hobbies in art, sport, journalism, etc. To accommodate the creativity of its members, RISKA often held a local of even international activities - the event are varied from sport, music, photography, youth community meeting, Ramadhan social activities etc.

== Departments ==
The Departments in RISKA are:

- ART
- AAR - Adik Asuh RISKA
- BMAQ - Belajar Mahir Al-Quran
- DKR - Departemen Kajian RISKA
- Cinematography
- SC - Sister Club
- Volaris - Vocal Class Riska
- RISCUE
- SDIS - Studi Dasar Islam Siswa
- SDTNI - Studi Dasar Terpadu Nilai Islam
