= SMS Prinz Eugen =

Three ships of the Austrian and later Austro-Hungarian Navy have been named SMS Prinz Eugen in honor of Prince Eugene of Savoy

- SMS Prinz Eugen (1854), a paddle steamer built in the 1850s
- SMS Prinz Eugen (1862), a broadside ironclad that fought at the Battle of Lissa
- SMS Prinz Eugen (1877), a casemate ship built in the 1870s to replace the original vessel
- SMS Prinz Eugen (1912), a dreadnought battleship built in the 1910s

== See also ==
- German cruiser Prinz Eugen, a heavy cruiser named in honor of the earlier Austro-Hungarian vessels and ceded after the war to the US Navy
- HMS Prince Eugene, a British monitor named in honor of Eugene of Savoy
- Italian cruiser Eugenio di Savoia, an Italian cruiser of the Condottieri class named in honor of Eugene of Savoy. Ceded to Greece in 1950.
