= Organisationsforum Wirtschaftskongress =

- World Business Dialogue
- Abbreviation: OfW
- Formation: 1984; 42 years ago
- Founders: Christian Rast
- Type: Nonprofit company with limited liability
- Legal status: GmbH company
- Purpose: Running events for business students
- Location: Cologne, Germany
- Region served: Worldwide
- Services: Annual congress
- Key people: Emilia Wilden; Emma Sommer
- Funding: Sponsorship from international companies
- Website: world-business-dialogue.com

The Organisationsforum Wirtschaftskongress (OFW) is a student-run, non-profit initiative that affords "high-performance students" the opportunity to turn their theoretical business knowledge into entrepreneurial actions. For this purpose, the members organise the annual World Business Dialogue, which unites 400 international students with companies and young leaders as well as top-class speakers.

The headquarter of the company is located in Cologne, Germany.

== History ==
Since 1984, the company, which is run by students, puts emphasis on practical experience rather than the theoretical aspects with which the students are confronted in university day by day. This is why Christian Rast initiated the World Business Dialogue. In addition to the entrepreneurial responsibility on behalf of the students who are in charge for the organisation of the event, another goal of the conference is to offer a platform for fundamental discussion about important economical issues as seen from the perspective of the currently studying generation. This event originally took place every two years, and then annually from 2009 until 2019. The option to take part in training opportunities provides the students with experience in business management.

The project OFW is counselled and looked after by committees so that a certain continuity and sustainability is ensured. These committees consist of a broad range of German companies.

In 1992 the OSCAR OFW Student Consulting and Research GmbH, a student business consultancy, emerged from the former association Organisationsforum Wirtschaftskongress. Since 2012 both corporations act as fellow subsidiaries.

== Organization ==
The company is divided into seven independently working departments: product management & speakers, human resources, corporate relations, marketing & public Relations, event management and finance & control.

A chairmanship guides the students and advises the executive board when it comes to strategic questions. This is superior to the board of trustees, a counselling organ of the OFW. In order to ensure professionalism, the seats of the board of trustees are divided between leading figures of the business management.

Another sponsor of the association is the advisory board, which consists of former members and supports the work regarding the conference.

== World Business Dialogue ==
Every two years from 1987-2007 and from 2009 until 2019 annually, the World Business Dialogue took place. After the outbreak of the corona pandemic, the congresses were canceled until further notice, but the core team of the OfW is working on continuing the congresses. The World Business Dialogue international conference that invites approximately 400 international students, speakers and entrepreneurial participants to the University of Cologne. Its goal is the dialogue about urgent and up-to-date economical issues between companies, scientists and students. The event distinguishes itself especially in presenting famous speakers such as Bill Gates.
