= Electoral results for the Division of Sturt =

Australian division election results

This is a list of electoral results for the Division of Sturt in Australian federal elections from the division's creation in 1949 until the present.

== Members ==
Member	Party	Term
Keith Wilson	Liberal	1949–1954
Norman Makin	Labor	1954–1955
(Sir) Keith Wilson	Liberal	1955–1966
Ian Wilson	Liberal	1966–1969
Norm Foster	Labor	1969–1972
Ian Wilson	Liberal	1972–1993
Christopher Pyne	Liberal	1993–2019
James Stevens	Liberal	2019–2025
Claire Clutterham	Labor	2025–present

== Election results ==
=== Elections in the 2020s ===
==== 2025 ====
2025 Australian federal election: Sturt
Party	Candidate	Votes	%	±%
Labor	Claire Clutterham	10,413	34.14	+3.94
Liberal	James Stevens	9,788	32.09	−9.69
Greens	Katie McCusker	5,633	18.47	−0.31
Independent	Verity Cooper	2,506	8.22	+8.22
One Nation	Peter Bogatec	994	3.26	+0.87
Family First	Mervin Joshua	596	1.95	+1.95
Trumpet of Patriots	Nicholas Duffield	570	1.87	+1.13
Total formal votes		30,500	97.06	+3.07
Informal votes		923	2.94	−3.07
Turnout		31,423	24.11	

Results are not final. Last updated on 3 May 2025 at 8:36 PM AEST.

==== 2022 ====
2022 Australian federal election: Sturt
Party	Candidate	Votes	%	±%
Liberal	James Stevens	48,579	43.14	−7.43
Labor	Sonja Baram	34,528	30.66	+0.80
Greens	Katie McCusker	18,454	16.39	+5.21
United Australia	Stephen Grant	3,008	2.67	+0.25
One Nation	Alexander Allwood	2,893	2.57	+2.57
Animal Justice	David Sherlock	1,531	1.36	−0.34
Liberal Democrats	Thomas McMahon	1,147	1.02	+1.02
Democratic Alliance	Inty Elham	1,007	0.89	+0.89
Federation	Kathy Scarborough	755	0.67	+0.67
Progressives	Angela Fulco	457	0.41	−0.10
TNL	Chris Schmidt	251	0.22	+0.22
Total formal votes		112,610	94.51	−0.12
Informal votes		6,541	5.49	+0.12
Turnout		119,151	92.38	−1.27
Two-party-preferred result
Liberal	James Stevens	56,813	50.45	−6.42
Labor	Sonja Baram	55,797	49.55	+6.42
Liberal hold		Swing	−6.42	

Alluvial diagram for preference flows in the seat of Sturt in the 2022 federal election. indicates at what stage the winning candidate had over 50% of the votes and was declared the winner.

=== Elections in the 2010s ===
==== 2019 ====
2019 Australian federal election: Sturt
Party	Candidate	Votes	%	±%
Liberal	James Stevens	55,490	50.57	+6.20
Labor	Cressida O'Hanlon	32,766	29.86	+6.56
Greens	Paul Boundy	12,263	11.18	+3.61
Independent	Nick Larcombe	2,906	2.65	+2.65
United Australia	Hedley Harding	2,657	2.42	+2.42
Animal Justice	Harbinda Roberts	1,866	1.70	+0.43
Child Protection	Colin Thomas	1,219	1.11	+1.11
Progressives	Angela Fulco	565	0.51	+0.51
Total formal votes		109,732	94.63	−1.78
Informal votes		6,221	5.37	+1.78
Turnout		115,953	93.65	+0.46
Two-party-preferred result
Liberal	James Stevens	62,404	56.87	+1.48
Labor	Cressida O'Hanlon	47,328	43.13	−1.48
Liberal hold		Swing	+1.48	

==== 2016 ====
2016 Australian federal election: Sturt
Party	Candidate	Votes	%	±%
Liberal	Christopher Pyne	41,351	44.45	−9.95
Labor	Matt Loader	20,653	22.20	−6.70
Xenophon	Matthew Wright	19,684	21.16	+21.16
Greens	Rebecca Galdies	6,575	7.07	−2.73
Family First	Craig Bowyer	2,912	3.13	−0.79
Animal Justice	Geoff Russell	1,220	1.31	+1.31
Independent	Neil Aitchison	637	0.68	+0.68
Total formal votes		93,032	96.22	+0.74
Informal votes		3,656	3.78	−0.74
Turnout		96,688	92.31	−1.14
Two-party-preferred result
Liberal	Christopher Pyne	51,998	55.89	−4.19
Labor	Matt Loader	41,034	44.11	+4.19
Liberal hold		Swing	−4.19	

==== 2013 ====
2013 Australian federal election: Sturt
Party	Candidate	Votes	%	±%
Liberal	Christopher Pyne	49,429	54.40	+6.22
Labor	Rick Sarre	26,258	28.90	−7.11
Greens	Anne Walker	8,902	9.80	−0.28
Family First	Kylie Barnes	3,565	3.92	+0.16
Palmer United	Gabriella Scali	2,713	2.99	+2.99
Total formal votes		90,867	95.48	+0.79
Informal votes		4,303	4.52	−0.79
Turnout		95,170	93.45	−0.99
Two-party-preferred result
Liberal	Christopher Pyne	54,591	60.08	+6.48
Labor	Rick Sarre	36,276	39.92	−6.48
Liberal hold		Swing	+6.48	

==== 2010 ====
2010 Australian federal election: Sturt
Party	Candidate	Votes	%	±%
Liberal	Christopher Pyne	42,418	48.05	+0.88
Labor	Rick Sarre	31,989	36.23	−5.23
Greens	Peter Fiebig	8,834	10.01	+3.60
Family First	Dale Clegg	3,346	3.79	+0.37
Liberal Democrats	Jess Clark	697	0.79	+0.43
Democrats	Darren Andrews	558	0.63	−0.54
One Nation	Jack King	443	0.50	+0.50
Total formal votes		88,285	94.62	−1.92
Informal votes		5,016	5.38	+1.92
Turnout		93,301	94.19	−1.39
Two-party-preferred result
Liberal	Christopher Pyne	47,172	53.43	+2.49
Labor	Rick Sarre	41,113	46.57	−2.49
Liberal hold		Swing	+2.49	

=== Elections in the 2000s ===
==== 2007 ====
2007 Australian federal election: Sturt
Party	Candidate	Votes	%	±%
Liberal	Christopher Pyne	42,731	47.17	−4.49
Labor	Mia Handshin	37,565	41.46	+6.91
Greens	Sally Reid	5,806	6.41	+0.35
Family First	Carol Jensen	3,102	3.42	−1.36
Democrats	Paul Rowse	1,054	1.17	−1.09
Liberty & Democracy	Felicity Tilbrook	327	0.36	+0.36
Total formal votes		90,595	96.54	+1.58
Informal votes		3,249	3.46	−1.58
Turnout		93,844	95.61	+0.82
Two-party-preferred result
Liberal	Christopher Pyne	46,153	50.94	−5.86
Labor	Mia Handshin	44,441	49.06	+5.86
Liberal hold		Swing	−5.86	

==== 2004 ====
2004 Australian federal election: Sturt
Party	Candidate	Votes	%	±%
Liberal	Christopher Pyne	45,007	51.66	+0.98
Labor	Tony Barca	30,099	34.55	+5.21
Greens	Zane Young	5,279	6.06	+2.28
Family First	Sally McPherson	4,167	4.78	+4.78
Democrats	Kerrin Pine	1,970	2.26	−9.01
One Nation	Brian Richards	597	0.69	−2.41
Total formal votes		87,119	94.96	+0.77
Informal votes		4,624	5.04	−0.77
Turnout		91,743	94.79	−0.95
Two-party-preferred result
Liberal	Christopher Pyne	49,481	56.80	−1.69
Labor	Tony Barca	37,638	43.20	+1.69
Liberal hold		Swing	−1.69	

==== 2001 ====
2001 Australian federal election: Sturt
Party	Candidate	Votes	%	±%
Liberal	Christopher Pyne	39,508	50.73	+2.84
Labor	Lindsay Simmons	23,143	29.72	−2.03
Democrats	Tim Farrow	8,438	10.83	−1.25
Greens	Mark Cullen	3,257	4.18	+4.18
One Nation	Brian Richards	2,451	3.15	−2.87
Independent	Neil Aitchison	1,081	1.39	+1.39
Total formal votes		77,878	94.74	−0.86
Informal votes		4,322	5.26	+0.86
Turnout		82,200	95.53	
Two-party-preferred result
Liberal	Christopher Pyne	45,310	58.18	+0.46
Labor	Lindsay Simmons	32,568	41.82	−0.46
Liberal hold		Swing	+0.46	

=== Elections in the 1990s ===
==== 1998 ====
1998 Australian federal election: Sturt
Party	Candidate	Votes	%	±%
Liberal	Christopher Pyne	34,703	47.77	−6.30
Labor	Lance Worrall	23,766	32.71	+0.80
Democrats	Jackie Dearing	8,174	11.25	+0.93
One Nation	Paul Sissons	4,385	6.04	+6.04
Natural Law	Lyndal Vincent	917	1.26	+0.47
Independent	Michal Kinasz	701	0.96	+0.96
Total formal votes		72,646	95.60	−0.56
Informal votes		3,347	4.40	+0.56
Turnout		75,993	95.20	+0.00
Two-party-preferred result
Liberal	Christopher Pyne	41,621	57.29	−2.70
Labor	Lance Worrall	31,025	42.71	+2.70
Liberal hold		Swing	−2.70	

==== 1996 ====
1996 Australian federal election: Sturt
Party	Candidate	Votes	%	±%
Liberal	Christopher Pyne	38,810	54.07	+14.66
Labor	George Vanco	22,906	31.91	−2.31
Democrats	Keith Oehme	7,408	10.32	+2.09
Greens	Craig Wilkins	2,078	2.90	+2.90
Natural Law	Vladimir Lorenzon	572	0.80	−0.78
Total formal votes		71,774	96.16	+0.60
Informal votes		2,868	3.84	−0.60
Turnout		74,642	95.21	+1.49
Two-party-preferred result
Liberal	Christopher Pyne	42,819	59.99	+4.28
Labor	George Vanco	28,560	40.01	−4.28
Liberal hold		Swing	+4.28	

==== 1993 ====
1993 Australian federal election: Sturt
Party	Candidate	Votes	%	±%
Liberal	Christopher Pyne	29,121	39.41	−7.58
Labor	Marco de Chellis	25,293	34.23	+0.16
	Mike Pratt	10,756	14.56	+14.56
Democrats	Elizabeth Williams	6,085	8.23	−6.47
Natural Law	Vladimir Lorenzon	1,167	1.58	+1.58
Call to Australia	Tom Curnow	783	1.06	−0.64
Independent	Geoff Freer	689	0.93	+0.93
Total formal votes		73,894	95.55	−0.56
Informal votes		3,439	4.45	+0.56
Turnout		77,333	93.71	
Two-party-preferred result
Liberal	Christopher Pyne	41,123	55.71	+1.04
Labor	Martin de Chellis	32,690	44.29	−1.04
Liberal hold		Swing	+1.04	

==== 1990 ====
1990 Australian federal election: Sturt
Party	Candidate	Votes	%	±%
Liberal	Ian Wilson	33,129	49.6	−1.7
Labor	Mark Hough	21,278	31.9	−6.2
Democrats	Arlyn Tombleson	9,989	15.0	+6.7
Grey Power	Elena Bulis	1,357	2.0	+2.0
Call to Australia	Tom Curnow	1,034	1.5	+1.5
Total formal votes		66,787	96.0	
Informal votes		2,782	4.0	
Turnout		69,569	95.9	
Two-party-preferred result
Liberal	Ian Wilson	38,493	57.7	+1.1
Labor	Mark Hough	28,162	42.3	−1.1
Liberal hold		Swing	+1.1	

=== Elections in the 1980s ===
==== 1987 ====
1987 Australian federal election: Sturt
Party	Candidate	Votes	%	±%
Liberal	Ian Wilson	32,262	51.3	−1.2
Labor	Phil Robins	23,946	38.1	−2.2
Democrats	Karen Coleman	5,191	8.3	+1.1
National	Loma Silsbury	1,050	1.7	+1.7
Unite Australia	Graeme Matthews	419	0.7	+0.7
Total formal votes		62,868	93.2	
Informal votes		4,569	6.8	
Turnout		67,437	93.6	
Two-party-preferred result
Liberal	Ian Wilson	35,562	56.6	+0.6
Labor	Phil Robins	27,297	43.4	−0.6
Liberal hold		Swing	+0.6	

==== 1984 ====
1984 Australian federal election: Sturt
Party	Candidate	Votes	%	±%
Liberal	Ian Wilson	32,404	52.5	+2.1
Labor	Jim Gale	24,901	40.3	−0.4
Democrats	Alison Dolling	4,443	7.2	−1.7
Total formal votes		61,748	92.9	
Informal votes		4,687	7.1	
Turnout		66,435	95.0	
Two-party-preferred result
Liberal	Ian Wilson	34,599	56.0	+2.0
Labor	Jim Gale	27,146	44.0	−2.0
Liberal hold		Swing	+2.0	

==== 1983 ====
1983 Australian federal election: Sturt
Party	Candidate	Votes	%	±%
Liberal	Ian Wilson	36,656	48.4	−2.5
Labor	Sergio Ubaldi	32,350	42.7	+2.2
Democrats	Alison Dolling	6,764	8.9	+0.8
Total formal votes		75,770	97.5	
Informal votes		1,959	2.5	
Turnout		77,729	96.0	
Two-party-preferred result
Liberal	Ian Wilson	39,379	52.0	−2.0
Labor	Sergio Ubaldi	36,391	48.0	+2.0
Liberal hold		Swing	−2.0	

==== 1980 ====
1980 Australian federal election: Sturt
Party	Candidate	Votes	%	±%
Liberal	Ian Wilson	37,018	50.9	−0.1
Labor	Andrew Dunstan	29,457	40.5	−0.1
Democrats	David d'Angelo	5,903	8.1	−5.4
Progressive Conservative	Colin Wuttke	354	0.5	+0.5
Total formal votes		72,732	97.5	
Informal votes		1,902	2.5	
Turnout		74,634	95.2	
Two-party-preferred result
Liberal	Ian Wilson		54.0	−3.3
Labor	Andrew Dunstan		46.0	+3.3
Liberal hold		Swing	−3.3	

=== Elections in the 1970s ===
==== 1977 ====
1977 Australian federal election: Sturt
Party	Candidate	Votes	%	±%
Liberal	Ian Wilson	35,300	51.0	−3.7
Labor	Ann Pengelly	24,639	35.6	−2.2
Democrats	Dean Bendall	9,335	13.5	+13.5
Total formal votes		69,274	96.9	
Informal votes		2,235	3.1	
Turnout		71,509	95.6	
Two-party-preferred result
Liberal	Ian Wilson		57.3	−2.5
Labor	Ann Pengelly		35.6	+2.5
Liberal hold		Swing	−2.5	

==== 1975 ====
1975 Australian federal election: Sturt
Party	Candidate	Votes	%	±%
Liberal	Ian Wilson	37,087	54.2	+8.8
Labor	Graham Maguire	25,510	37.3	−6.9
Liberal Movement	Barry Lake	3,835	5.6	−1.6
Workers	William Forster	2,043	3.0	+3.0
Total formal votes		68,475	97.9	
Informal votes		1,500	2.1	
Turnout		69,975	97.0	
Two-party-preferred result
Liberal	Ian Wilson		60.3	+8.3
Labor	Graham Maguire		39.7	−8.3
Liberal hold		Swing	+8.3	

==== 1974 ====
1974 Australian federal election: Sturt
Party	Candidate	Votes	%	±%
Liberal	Ian Wilson	28,799	45.4	−5.1
Labor	Graham Maguire	28,088	44.2	−2.0
Liberal Movement	Betty Hall	4,553	7.2	+7.2
Australia	Roger Marshman	1,034	1.6	+1.6
Independent	Anthony Figallo	1,018	1.6	+1.6
Total formal votes		63,492	97.2	
Informal votes		1,802	2.8	
Turnout		65,294	96.7	
Two-party-preferred result
Liberal	Ian Wilson	33,005	52.0	−0.2
Labor	Graham Maguire	30,487	48.0	+0.2
Liberal hold		Swing	−0.2	

==== 1972 ====
1972 Australian federal election: Sturt
Party	Candidate	Votes	%	±%
Liberal	Ian Wilson	28,056	50.5	+3.0
Labor	Norm Foster	25,689	46.2	−3.8
Democratic Labor	Walter Doran	1,479	2.7	+0.3
National Socialist	Peter Wilkinson	321	0.6	+0.6
Total formal votes		55,545	97.5	
Informal votes		1,411	2.5	
Turnout		56,956	96.8	
Two-party-preferred result
Liberal	Ian Wilson		52.2	+2.7
Labor	Norm Foster		47.8	−2.7
Liberal gain from Labor		Swing	+2.7	

=== Elections in the 1960s ===
==== 1969 ====
1969 Australian federal election: Sturt
Party	Candidate	Votes	%	±%
Labor	Norm Foster	24,007	50.0	+16.1
Liberal	Ian Wilson	22,800	47.5	−14.3
Democratic Labor	Paul Hubert	1,164	2.4	−2.0
Total formal votes		47,971	96.7	
Informal votes		1,631	3.3	
Turnout		49,602	96.5	
Two-party-preferred result
Labor	Norm Foster		50.5	+15.0
Liberal	Ian Wilson		49.5	−15.0
Labor gain from Liberal		Swing	+15.0	

==== 1966 ====
1966 Australian federal election: Sturt
Party	Candidate	Votes	%	±%
Liberal	Ian Wilson	31,479	63.5	+7.5
Labor	Keith Le Page	15,941	32.2	−6.4
Democratic Labor	Walter Doran	2,157	4.4	−1.0
Total formal votes		49,577	97.9	
Informal votes		1,455	2.9	
Turnout		51,032	95.8	
Two-party-preferred result
Liberal	Ian Wilson		66.2	+6.7
Labor	Keith Le Page		33.8	−6.7
Liberal hold		Swing	+6.7	

==== 1963 ====
1963 Australian federal election: Sturt
Party	Candidate	Votes	%	±%
Liberal	Keith Wilson	26,469	56.0	+3.8
Labor	Norm Foster	18,264	38.6	−0.3
Democratic Labor	Walter Doran	2,551	5.4	−3.5
Total formal votes		47,284	98.0	
Informal votes		971	2.0	
Turnout		48,255	96.1	
Two-party-preferred result
Liberal	Keith Wilson		59.5	+1.0
Labor	Norm Foster		40.5	−1.0
Liberal hold		Swing	+1.0	

==== 1961 ====
1961 Australian federal election: Sturt
Party	Candidate	Votes	%	±%
Liberal	Keith Wilson	23,392	52.2	−4.9
Labor	Arthur Penn	17,430	38.9	+1.3
Democratic Labor	Walter Doran	4,000	8.9	+3.6
Total formal votes		44,822	97.0	
Informal votes		1,367	3.0	
Turnout		46,189	95.7	
Two-party-preferred result
Liberal	Keith Wilson		58.5	−2.8
Labor	Arthur Penn		41.5	+2.8
Liberal hold		Swing	−2.8	

=== Elections in the 1950s ===
==== 1958 ====
1958 Australian federal election: Sturt
Party	Candidate	Votes	%	±%
Liberal	Keith Wilson	24,325	57.1	−3.2
Labor	Siegfried Hausler	16,013	37.6	−2.1
Democratic Labor	Norman Vowles	2,266	5.3	+5.3
Total formal votes		42,604	97.0	
Informal votes		1,333	3.0	
Turnout		43,937	96.4	
Two-party-preferred result
Liberal	Keith Wilson		61.3	+1.0
Labor	Siegfried Hausler		38.7	−1.0
Liberal hold		Swing	+1.0	

==== 1955 ====
1955 Australian federal election: Sturt
Party	Candidate	Votes	%	±%
Liberal	Keith Wilson	24,306	60.3	+7.9
Labor	Frederick Hansford	16,022	39.7	−7.9
Total formal votes		40,328	96.1	
Informal votes		1,637	3.9	
Turnout		41,965	96.1	
Liberal notional hold		Swing	+7.9	

==== 1954 ====
1954 Australian federal election: Sturt
Party	Candidate	Votes	%	±%
Labor	Norman Makin	25,857	53.0	+5.4
Liberal	Keith Wilson	22,890	47.0	−5.4
Total formal votes		48,747	98.5	
Informal votes		729	1.5	
Turnout		49,476	97.1	
Labor gain from Liberal		Swing	+5.4	

==== 1951 ====
1951 Australian federal election: Sturt
Party	Candidate	Votes	%	±%
Liberal	Keith Wilson	22,599	52.4	+1.6
Labor	Leslie McMullin	20,554	47.6	+2.4
Total formal votes		43,153	97.7	
Informal votes		1,038	2.3	
Turnout		44,191	97.3	
Liberal hold		Swing	−0.4	

=== Elections in the 1940s ===
==== 1949 ====
1949 Australian federal election: Sturt
Party	Candidate	Votes	%	±%
Liberal	Keith Wilson	21,157	50.8	+7.2
Labor	Leslie McMullin	18,828	45.2	−8.8
Independent	Leonard Smith	1,628	3.9	+3.9
Total formal votes		41,613	97.4	
Informal votes		1,123	2.6	
Turnout		42,736	96.6	
Two-party-preferred result
Liberal	Keith Wilson		52.8	+8.9
Labor	Leslie McMullin		47.2	−8.9
Liberal notional gain from Labor		Swing	+8.9	
