= Christopher Pyne =

Australian politician (born 1967)

The Honourable Christopher Pyne
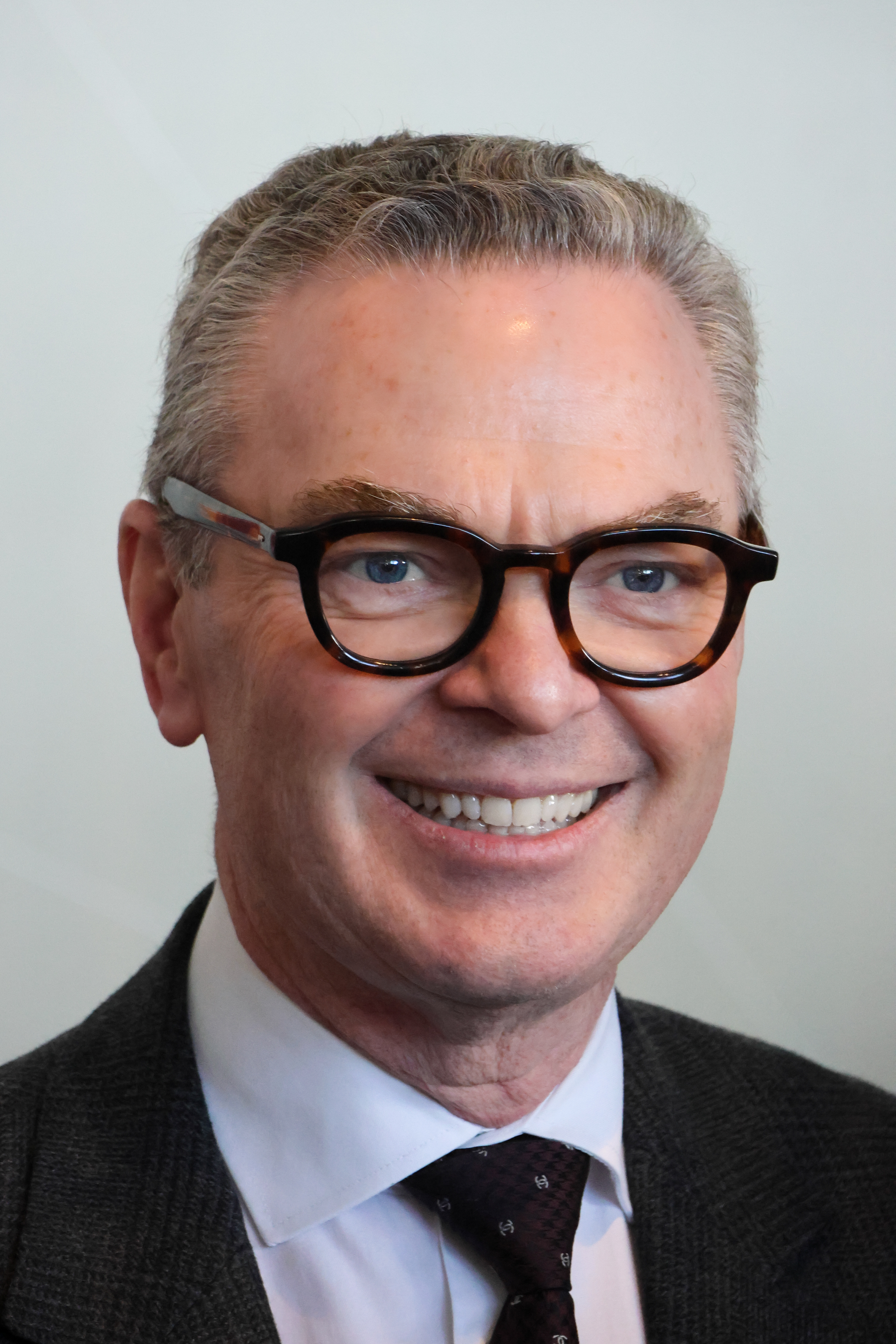
- Pyne in 2026

Minister for Defence
- In office 28 August 2018 – 29 May 2019
- Prime Minister: Scott Morrison
- Preceded by: Marise Payne
- Succeeded by: Linda Reynolds
Previous offices 2007–2018
Minister for Defence Industry
In office 19 July 2016 – 27 August 2018
Prime Minister	Malcolm Turnbull; Scott Morrison
Preceded by	Dan Tehan (as Minister for Defence Materiel)
Succeeded by	Steven Ciobo
Leader of the House
In office 18 September 2013 – 26 May 2019
Prime Minister	Tony Abbott; Malcolm Turnbull; Scott Morrison
Deputy	Darren Chester
Preceded by	Anthony Albanese
Succeeded by	Christian Porter
Minister for Industry, Innovation and Science
In office 21 September 2015 – 19 July 2016
Prime Minister	Malcolm Turnbull
Preceded by	Ian Macfarlane
Succeeded by	Greg Hunt
Minister for Education and Training
In office 18 September 2013 – 21 September 2015
Prime Minister	Tony Abbott; Malcolm Turnbull
Preceded by	Bill Shorten
Succeeded by	Simon Birmingham
Manager of Opposition Business
In office 16 February 2009 – 18 September 2013
Deputy	Luke Hartsuyker
Leader	Malcolm Turnbull; Tony Abbott
Preceded by	Joe Hockey
Succeeded by	Tony Burke
Minister for Ageing
In office 21 March 2007 – 3 December 2007
Prime Minister	John Howard
Preceded by	Santo Santoro
Succeeded by	Justine Elliot
Assistant Minister for Health and Ageing
In office 30 January 2007 – 21 March 2007
Prime Minister	John Howard
Preceded by	Office established
Succeeded by	Fiona Nash

Member of the Australian Parliament for Sturt
- In office 13 March 1993 – 11 April 2019
- Preceded by: Ian Wilson
- Succeeded by: James Stevens

Personal details
- Born: Christopher Maurice Pyne; 13 August 1967 (age 59) Adelaide, South Australia
- Party: Liberal
- Spouse: Carolyn Twelftree (m. 1994)
- Children: 4
- Education: University of Adelaide; University of South Australia
- Profession: Lawyer; politician
- Website: Official website

Christopher Maurice Pyne (born 13 August 1967) is a retired Australian politician. He was a member of the Liberal Party, and served as a minister in the Howard, Abbott, Turnbull and Morrison governments. He was the member of Parliament (MP) for the South Australian division of Sturt from 1993 to 2019.

Born in Adelaide, Pyne graduated from the University of Adelaide in 1988 with a Bachelor of Laws, and worked as a solicitor from 1991 to 1993. He was elected to the House of Representatives at the 1993 federal election, winning the Adelaide seat of Sturt. Pyne was Assistant Minister for Health and Ageing and Minister for Ageing in 2007 until the Liberal–National Coalition's defeat at the election that year. He became Leader of the House and Minister for Education and Training after the Coalition's victory at the 2013 election; Minister for Industry, Innovation and Science in 2015; Minister for Defence Industry in 2016; and Minister for Defence in 2018.

Pyne retired from politics in 2019, not standing at the that year's election, famously stating that "it's nice to leave when people are asking you to stay." In June 2019, he was appointed as an industry professor at the University of South Australia. In the same month, Pyne began at a new defence industry consulting position, prompting a Senate investigation into a potential breach of Ministerial Standards which resulted in no claims nor allegations against Pyne.

== Early life and education ==
Christopher Maurice Pyne was born on 13 August 1967 in Adelaide. He is the fifth and youngest child of a Jesuit family: Remington John Pyne (1929–1988), an ophthalmic surgeon, and Margaret Elsie Pyne (née Evans; 1929–2022), and grew up in suburban Burnside, South Australia.

He was educated at Saint Ignatius' College and the University of Adelaide, where he graduated with a Bachelor of Laws and was President of Adelaide University Liberal Club from 1987 to 1988. Pyne attained a Graduate Diploma in Legal Practice from the University of South Australia in 1991. In 2022, he was granted an Honorary Doctorate in the School of the Professions from his alma mater, the University of Adelaide.

Pyne was a research assistant to Senator Amanda Vanstone and later became president of the South Australian Young Liberals from 1988 to 1990. He was pre-selected as the Liberal candidate for the safe Labor seat of Ross Smith at the 1989 state election but was defeated by the sitting member and Premier of South Australia, John Bannon. He earned a Graduate Diploma of Legal Practice at the University of South Australia and began practising as a solicitor in 1991.

== Political career ==
At the 1993 election, aged 25, Pyne was elected to the South Australian division of Sturt in the House of Representatives. He had earlier defeated Sturt incumbent Ian Wilson in a Liberal pre-selection ballot for the seat. Wilson had held the seat for all but one term since the 1966 election. Between them, he and his father, Keith, had held the seat for all but four years since its creation in 1949. Wilson was 35 years Pyne's senior; indeed, he had won his first election a year before Pyne was born.

Election in Sturt	1993	1996	1998	2001	2004	2007	2010	2013	2016
First preference %	39.4	54.1	47.8	50.7	51.7	47.2	48.1	54.4	44.4
Two-party-preferred %	55.7	60.0	57.3	58.2	56.8	50.9	53.4	60.1	55.9

Pyne is a republican, like his longtime ally, Malcolm Turnbull, and established himself as a member of the moderate, "small-l liberal" faction of the Liberal Party, and a supporter of Treasurer and Deputy Liberal Party Leader Peter Costello. Pyne remains a close ally of state Liberal Vickie Chapman.

In 1994, after serving as a backbencher for a period, Pyne was appointed Parliamentary Secretary to the Shadow Minister for Social Security. He retained this position after John Howard was elected as leader, and up to the 1996 election.

=== Howard government ===
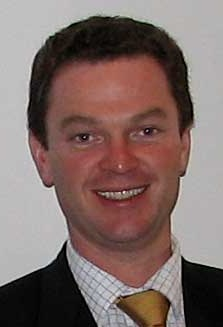
Pyne in 2006

After the 1996 Coalition victory, Pyne sat as a backbencher. He chaired the Australia Israel Parliamentary group from 1996 to 2004. In 2003, he was appointed Parliamentary Secretary to the Minister for Family and Community Services, where he remained until 2004, when named Parliamentary Secretary to the Minister for Health and Ageing. As Parliamentary Secretary, he defended the government's 'war on drugs' and established his strong support of illicit drug prohibition, as opposed to harm minimisation. He launched the youth mental health initiative Headspace.

Pyne served as a Parliamentary Secretary until 30 January 2007, when he was appointed Assistant Minister for Health and Ageing. He held this portfolio until 21 March, when he was elevated to the outer ministry as Minister for Ageing, succeeding resigning Minister, Senator Santo Santoro.

=== Opposition ===
With the Liberal–National Coalition's defeat at the 2007 election, Pyne came close to losing Sturt to Labor candidate Mia Handshin, suffering a 5.9 percent two-party-preferred (TPP) swing, resulting in a 0.9 percent TPP margin (856 votes), making Sturt the most marginal seat in South Australia. After the election, he nominated himself as a candidate for deputy leader of the Liberal Party at the 2007 Liberal leadership election, losing to Julie Bishop. Following the election of Brendan Nelson as leader, Pyne was appointed Shadow Minister for Justice and Border Protection.

After Malcolm Turnbull's election as leader of the Liberal Party at the 2008 leadership spill, Pyne was appointed to the shadow cabinet as Shadow Minister for Education, Apprenticeships and Training. After Julie Bishop's resignation from the position of Shadow Treasurer, she was replaced by Joe Hockey, with Pyne replacing Hockey as Manager of Opposition Business in the House on 16 February 2009.

Pyne remained as Manager of Opposition Business in the House and Shadow Minister for Education, Apprenticeships and Training after Tony Abbott's victory over Turnbull at the 2009 leadership spill. Pyne was re-elected at the 2010 election, receiving a 2.5 percent TPP swing to finish with a marginal 53.4 percent TPP vote, no longer the most marginal electorate of South Australia. He was re-appointed as Manager of Opposition Business in the House and Shadow Minister for Education, Apprenticeships and Training.

=== Abbott government ===
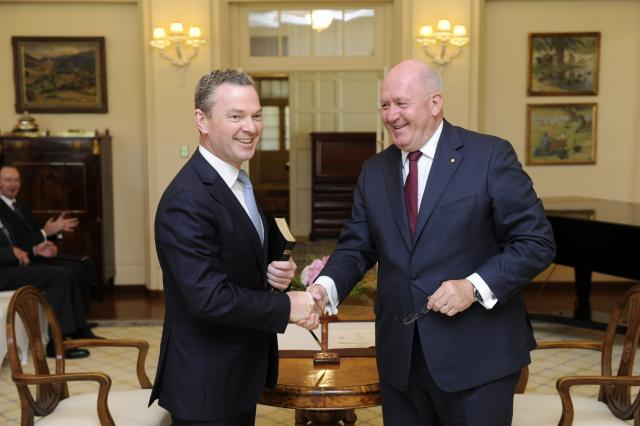
Pyne being sworn in as Minister for Education and Training by Governor-General Sir Peter Cosgrove, 2014

Pyne was re-elected at the 2013 election, receiving a 6.5 percent TPP swing towards him, to resulting in a 60.1 percent TPP vote, making Sturt a safe Liberal electorate. Pyne joined the cabinet on 18 September 2013 as Leader of the House and Minister for Education in the Abbott government. In December 2014, his position was renamed to Minister for Education and Training.

As Minister for Education and Training, Pyne enacted changes to the education system to provide minimum standards for teachers, promoted independent public schooling, expanded phonics teaching, and created a new national curriculum. Pyne also attempted to reform the university sector to introduce market principles but was rejected by the Senate.

In May 2014, Pyne suggested that HECS debts should be reclaimed from the estates of deceased students.

=== Turnbull government ===
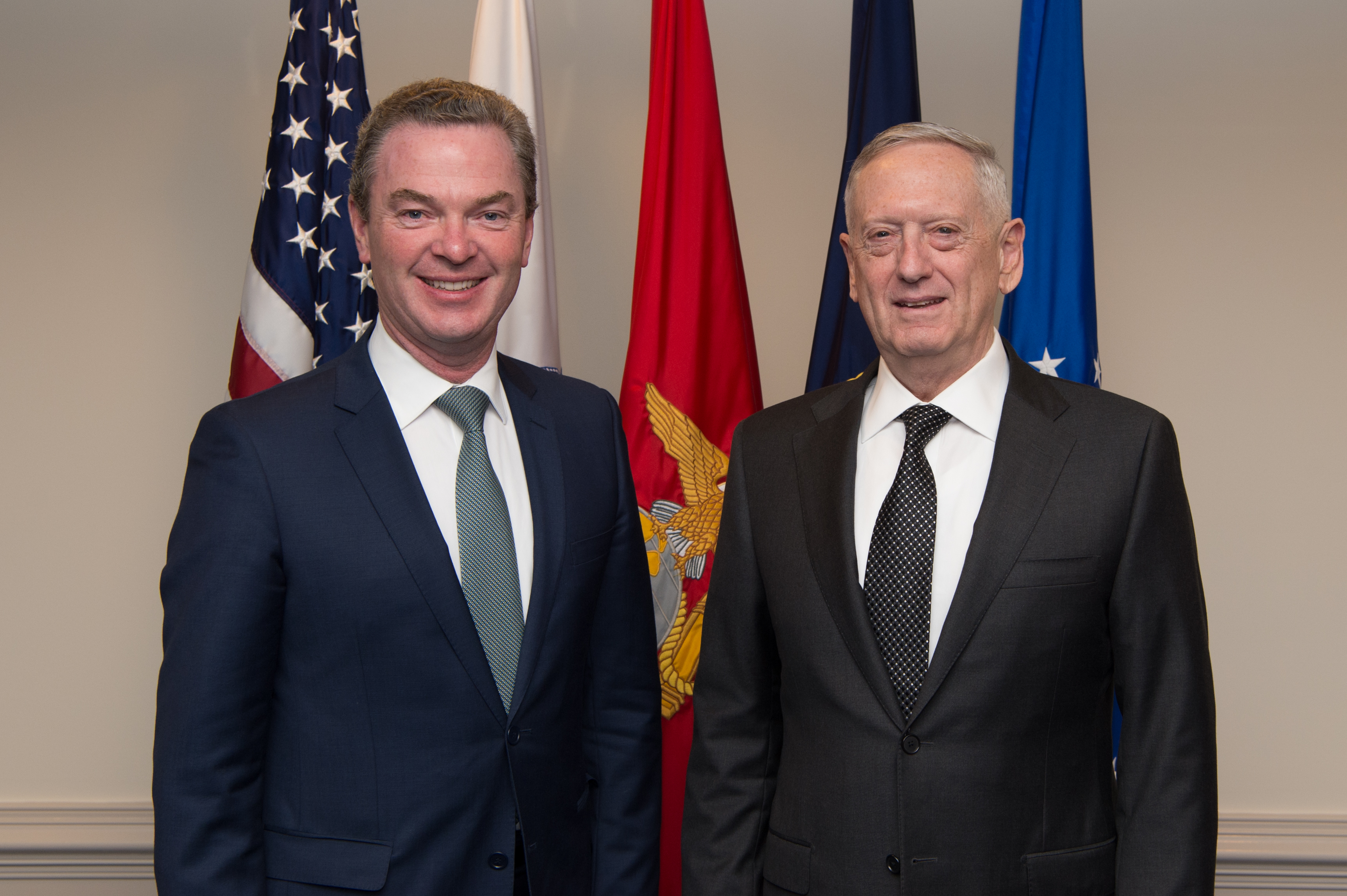
Pyne with Jim Mattis, the United States Secretary of Defense, in April 2017

Despite much speculation Pyne would be appointed as Defence Minister, he remained Leader of the House and was appointed as Minister for Industry, Innovation and Science in the Turnbull government following Malcolm Turnbull's re-ascension at the 2015 Liberal leadership ballot. As Minister for Industry, Innovation and Science, Pyne was credited with creating and implementing the National Innovation and Science Agenda (NISA), which was central to Turnbull's agenda.

With the reelection of the Turnbull government at the 2016 election, Pyne became the Minister for Defence Industry in the second Turnbull ministry. As Minister for Defence Industry, Pyne was given responsibility for implementing the largest modernisation of the Australian Defence Force since the Second World War, increasing the Australian Government's investment in defence capability to almost $200 billion.

From 2016 to 2019, Pyne co-hosted weekly television program Pyne & Marles on Sky News Live with Labor Party member and now Deputy Prime Minister Richard Marles.

Pyne retained Sturt at the 2016 election for the Liberals with a 55.9 percent two-party vote from a 4.2 percent two-party swing, reducing the seat from a safe to marginal status.

Pyne has stated he has always been in favour of same-sex marriage. Infamously, in November 2016, the Australian Federal Police investigated claims that Pyne's Twitter account was "hacked" after it had been found to have liked, and shared a pornographic image depicting a gay sexual act.

=== Morrison government ===
Following Scott Morrison's election as leader of the Liberal Party and prime minister at the 2018 leadership spill, Pyne was promoted to Minister for Defence.

On 2 March 2019, Pyne announced that he would not recontest the seat of Sturt at the 2019 election, and would retire from politics. The House of Representatives was dissolved on 11 April 2019.

== Post-political career ==
Since retiring from Parliament in April 2019, Pyne has chaired the strategic advisory and public affairs firm, Pyne and Partners, operating offices in Sydney, Canberra and Adelaide. He also chairs Vision2020 Australia, launched jointly by the World Health Organization and International Agency for the Prevention of Blindness, and the Australia United Arab Emirates Business Council.

Since late 2020, Pyne has taken on roles in the Australian defence industry. He is chairman of the advisory board of Australia's largest Australian owned small arms and munitions company Nioa, and chairman of the advisory board of the Australian Missile Corporation. He also sits on the board of ASX-listed Xtek Ltd, a Canberra-based body armour and unmanned vehicle manufacturer and supplier globally.

Pyne is the Executive Chairman of the South Australia (SA) branch of the American Chamber of Commerce in Australia, and an Ambassador of the Adelaide Football Club.

In February 2024 he was appointed chair of COTA Australia (previously Council on the Ageing).

Pyne was appointed to the National Library of Australia Council on 20 November 2025.

=== Lobbying ===
Pyne was listed on the South Australian lobbyist register on 26 July 2019 as a co-owner of GC Advisory Pty Ltd, which he co-owns with Adam Howard. The firm's clientele includes Duxton Capital, Hickinbotham Group, Polites Group, RacingSA, the City of Burnside and Thomson Geer Lawyers.

== Personal life ==
Pyne married Carolyn Twelftree in 1994. They have four children together. He currently resides in Adelaide.

He spoke passionately at the retirement of former (Labor) prime minister Kevin Rudd, revealing that they were both members of the same prayer group, and praising his support during a difficult time for the Pyne family.

In March 2025, Pyne underwent a surgery for a heart bypass, Pyne stated "I am lucky to live in a time when a procedure like this is routine, and where, at 57, I can gain a renovated new heart".

Pyne has two West Highland Terriers named Scout and Archibald who are "very needy".

== Bibliography ==
- A Letter To My Children (2015), non-fiction
- The Insider (2020), non-fiction

Parliament of Australia
Preceded by Ian Wilson	Member for Sturt; 1993–2019	Succeeded by James Stevens
Political offices
Preceded by Santo Santoro	Minister for Ageing; 2007	Succeeded by Justine Elliot
Preceded by Joe Hockey	Manager of Opposition Business in the House; 2009–2013	Succeeded by Tony Burke
Preceded by Anthony Albanese	Leader of the House; 2013–2019	Succeeded by Christian Porter
Preceded by Bill Shorten	Minister for Education; 2013–2015	Succeeded by Simon Birmingham
Preceded by Himself as Minister for Education	Minister for Training; 2014–2015	Succeeded by Simon Birmingham
Preceded by Ian Macfarlane	Minister for Industry, Innovation and Science; 2015–2016	Succeeded by Greg Hunt
Preceded by Dan Tehan as Minister for Defence Materiel	Minister for Defence Industry; 2016–2018	Succeeded by Steven Ciobo
Preceded by Marise Payne	Minister for Defence; 2018–2019	Succeeded by Linda Reynolds
