= YMCA Youth Parliament =

Model parliament program in Australia

Dempsey Bloom, 2012 Youth Member for Wollondilly and Youth Shadow Minister for Aboriginal Affairs debates the Aboriginal Funding Control Bill 2012. New South Wales.

Youth Parliament 2013 Recruitment Logo.

The YMCA Youth Parliament is a YMCA run youth model parliament program. There is a YMCA youth parliament in every Australian State and Territory.

Participants spend time in committees developing bills, and then attend a week-long camp during which the legislation and other motions are debated in the state parliament. Successfully passed bills are handed to the state government and opposition for consideration.

== History ==
It is a YMCA sponsored youth model parliament programme. There is a YMCA youth parliament in every Australian state and territory. The first Australian Youth Parliament was held in Brisbane in 1963, based on the American "YMCA Youth and Government" concept.

== Overview ==
The age ranges vary by state. For example, in Queensland, Youth Members are 15 to 25 years of age, while in South Australia, the ages range from 16 to 25. Participants generally represent their local member of Parliament or Member of the Legislative Council and meet during a weekend long training camp where they learn the workings of the bearpit, how to create a bill, conduct debates in Legislative Assembly or the Legislative Council, and amend and vote on bills and general motions. Students visit the Legislative Assembly and the Government House.

== National Youth Parliament ==
The Speaker of the House of Representatives announced on 11 February 2025 that a National Youth Parliament program would be held in 2026.

On 23 July 2025, the Parliament of Australia announced that YMCA was selected to be the delivery partner for the National Youth Parliament to be held in Canberra in August 2026.

== State programs ==
=== New South Wales ===
The YMCA NSW Youth Parliament is open to young people aged 15 to 18 who represent their local electorate in the Legislative Assembly or NSW in the Legislative Council.

The YMCA NSW Youth Parliament program was launched in 2002, attracting 32 participants representing regional teams. As the program progressed, parliamentary committees were established. Among bills, the Youth Parliament also advocates for change with motions. The YMCA NSW Youth Parliament passed the Same-Sex Marriage Matter of Public Importance (MPI) in 2012 with 70 ayes to 11 noes, which made them "among the largest groups in favour of legalising for marriage equality."

A Bill for Marriage Equality was passed in the Legislative Assembly the following year 72 ayes to 0 noes, making this the first unanimous vote for marriage equality. The bill further passed the Legislative Council 40 ayes to 4 noes.

2013 saw the introduction of the Legislative Council and the creation of the YMCA Youth & Government suite of programs, making it the only YMCA Youth Parliament in Australia to run a bicameral Parliament and programs other than that of the initial Youth Parliament.

=== Queensland ===
YMCA Queensland Youth Parliament (abbreviated as QYP) is a non-partisan political program providing a platform for young people aged 15 – 25 to have their say on important issues, build skills and parliamentary understanding, while simulating the Queensland Legislative Assembly. The program selects one individual, aged 15 to 25 years old, to represent each electorate in the state, for a total of 93 participants (known as Youth Members).

In the program, Youth Members attend a 3-day Launch Weekend during April in Brisbane and meet the other Youth Members and discuss ideas. They then spend the rest of the program researching and drafting Youth Bills and policy proposals, while also advocating for their communities. The program culminates with Residential Sitting Week in September where Youth Members debate their Youth Bills and other measures in Queensland Parliament House.

Youth Members are organised into portfolios based on their areas of interest.

In 2021, the youth portfolios are:

- Aboriginal and Torres Strait Islander Partnerships portfolio (ATSIP);
- Agricultural Industries, Resources & Rural Development portfolio (AIRD);
- Education, Industrial Relations, Employment and Training portfolio (EEIRT);
- Health, Emergency Services, Disability and Seniors portfolio (HEDS);
- Environment, Renewables, Energy and Tourism portfolio (ERET);
- Domestic & Family Violence, Housing and Infrastructure portfolio (VHIT);
- Science, Technology and Digital Economies portfolio (STDE); and
- Justice, Legal Affairs and Corrections portfolio (JLAC).

Queensland Youth Parliament's Executive also run the Your Voice Heard Blog featuring blog posts from Youth Members and other young Queenslanders.

In 2021, the program ran its first ever Regional Tour, aimed at promoting young engagement in rural areas.

Currently the program is in its 26th year, running since 1992 with more than 1500 young people participating. Some of these people have become lawyers, members of parliament, doctors, army staff and miners. The Youth Governor of the 26th YMCA Queensland Youth Parliament is Benjamin Crowley.

Alumni of the program include Kate Jones, former Queensland MP and Minister who was a Youth Premier when she completed the program.

Many Youth Acts of the Queensland Youth Parliament were then passed by their senior counterparts and made into fully fledged laws of Queensland, including the criminalisation of revenge pornography, and changes to learner driver log books.

=== Northern Territory ===
The Northern Territory program was revived in 2023, after an 8-year hiatus. The program brings together young people aged 16–25 from across the Northern Territory. Aiming to empower young Territorians by providing a platform to develop leadership skills, learn about the political process, and advocate for issues they care about, the program has had many notable alumni.

=== South Australia ===
YMCA South Australia Youth Parliament is a non-partisan program providing a platform for young people aged 15 – 25 to have their say on important issues, build skills and parliamentary understanding. It focuses on personal development, empowerment and connecting politicians and decision makers with youth voices and opinions. The Youth Parliament program runs from March to August every year and includes mentoring, a training weekend, a week-long camp and access to Parliament House. Every year, young leaders come together to learn about public speaking, parliamentary etiquette, bill development and youth advocacy. They share their big ideas, discuss the challenges facing South Australia and create solutions in the form of Youth Bills.

The program is intended to be "rewarding and educational". Cassandra Attwood, a past participant, commented, "I want to be a lawyer, so I think it gives me a lot of good experience in public speaking and being able to think on your feet," she said.

Playford mayor Glen Docherty, Australia's Labor minister Kate Ellis, and policy adviser, Mia Handshin are alumni of the program.

In South Australia, the ages range from 15 to 25. The 23-year program has seen more than 1,000 youth participate in the program that is supported by the Government of South Australia's Office for Youth.

=== Tasmania ===
The Tasmania Youth Parliament conducts an annual event at state capital's Parliament House in Hobart. There they follow "real government" procedures for drafting and debating bills. Government Whip Felicity Grey stated, "It’s a good way to get into public speaking and to meet not only like minded people but to have your own opinions challenged."

=== Victoria ===
The first YMCA Victoria Youth Parliament was held in the Legislative Council of Parliament House in September 1987 and has been held yearly since then. The program is offered to individuals between 16 and 25 years of age; participants engage in a 9-day residential program, part of which is conducted at Parliament House.

The Youth Parliament, supported by the Victoria government, have seen more than 20 of their bills passed into law, including alcohol, bike and nightclub safety measures.

At the 2012 session, six Hazara young men were part of the Victoria Youth Parliament and asked the Prime Minister to put pressure on the Pakistani government to stop genocide of Hazra people and brought awareness of the plight of fleeing people, such as those who come to Australia by boat. Wahid Omid Talked said: "all Hazara asylum seekers who comes to Australia and seek protection here are prosecuted by Taliban and other terrorist and extremist groups." Regarding why they don't remain in queues in Indonesia's refugee camps: "the queue is imaginary and does not exist, people have been waiting for up to 10 years in Indonesia to be settled in 3th [sic] country and the applications in UNHCR (United Nations High Commissioner for Refugees) office is processed randomly not by turn." The group of youth parliamentary participants debated the following day about how to welcome people seeking asylum in Australia.

=== Western Australia ===
The Western Australian Youth Parliament is a program coordinated by the YMCA of Perth, and acts as the most senior youth advisory body to the Western Australian government. Participants spend time in committees developing bills, and then attend a week-long camp during which the legislation and other motions are debated in the Western Australian Parliament. Successfully passed bills are handed to the state government for consideration. In 2004 the first regional Youth Parliament sitting occurred in Albany, Western Australia. Young people from 15 to 25 years of age may participate in the program.

== National Indigenous Youth Parliament ==
To mark the 50th anniversary of Indigenous Australians obtaining the right to vote, the Museum of Australian Democracy, YMCA, and Australian Electoral Commission (AEC) collaborated on a week long event in May 2012 for the first "National Indigenous Youth Parliament" (NIYP).

Participants were up to 25 years old and were selected from a group of more than 180 people for their leadership skills and interest in the parliamentary process. Each state and territory had six representatives; Torres Strait Islands had two representatives at the parliamentary event. They spent one week in Canberra and learned about the process of making laws, public speaking and fielding inquiries from the media. The State News Service reported that "The Bills passed by the Youth Parliament will then be presented to Government representatives for consideration in developing policies."

A video commemorating the event followed the experiences of participants of the event, including a 2-day parliamentary session at Old Parliament House in Canberra. The event that taught participants about workings of the parliamentary process, one of the participants, Jaleesa Donovan, stated that she felt that she gained leadership skills and motivation to help her in her relationships and future as a community member and worker.

NIYP members met with the prime minister, members of parliament and indigenous community members. Tom Rogers, Acting Electoral Commissioner, said: "The young participants have returned to their communities to share their NIYP experiences and skills, and we look forward to seeing them again, who knows, perhaps as elected Members of Parliament."

== Alumni ==
- Glenn Docherty
- Kate Ellis
- Mia Handshin
- Adam Marshall
- Kate Jones
- Chris Crewther
- Chris Rath

== See also ==
- YMCA NSW Youth Parliament
- YMCA Youth and Government, United States
- Youth council
