= Australian Missile Corporation =

Australian weapons company

- Industry: Defence
- Founded: 2021
- Headquarters: Brisbane, Queensland, Australia
- Key people: Lee Goddard (CEO)
- Products: Missiles
- Owner: NIOA
- Website: www.amc.com.au

The Australian Missile Corporation (AMC) is an Australian armaments company specialising in guided and non-guided weapon systems, and a wholly owned subsidiary of Queensland-based defence prime contractor NIOA. It was contracted by the Australian Government as an enterprise partner to help enable the development of a domestic guided and non-guided weapons manufacturing capability. The company’s inaugural and current chief executive officer, Lee Goddard, is a retired Rear Admiral of the Royal Australian Navy.

As part of a 2021 initiative, headed by the Department of Defence, the Guided Weapons and Explosive Ordnance Enterprise ("GWEO") program is intended to facilitate a domestic missile manufacturing capability. It is also supported by Aurecon, as enterprise partner, and multinational arms companies Lockheed Martin and Raytheon as strategic partners.

GWEO was established under the prime ministership of Scott Morrison, whose messaging throughout his career not irregularly touched on the importance of Australia's defence infrastructure and capabilities. A RAND Corporation analysis from 2022 notes the creation of the GWEO was prefaced in the 2020 Defence Strategic Update.

== History ==
On 3 June 2021, Black Sky Aerospace and Quickstep are among the first companies to partner with the Australian Missile Corporation in their bid for the Australian Government's sovereign guided missiles project.

On 22 August 2022, the AMC agreed to enter into a strategic partnership with American defence contractor Day & Zimmermann.

On 23 August 2022, the AMC received the backings of MBDA, a European guided weapons joint venture of Airbus, BAE Systems and Leonardo.

On 22 September 2022, the AMC formally accepted the contact to become an inaugural Enterprise Partner for the GWEO.

== See also ==
- List of modern armament manufacturers
