= YMCA Queensland Youth Parliament =

Australian non-partisan youth parliament

- Program's logo
- Abbreviation: QYP
- Formation: 1996
- Type: Youth Parliament
- Legal status: Non-profit
- Purpose: Non-partisan youth government program
- Headquarters: Brisbane, Queensland
- Location: 101 Brunswick Street, Fortitude Valley QLD 4006
- Region served: Queensland
- Official language: English
- Youth Governor: Layla Gossage
- Program Coordinator: Grace Campbell
- Parent organization: YMCA
- Affiliations: YMCA Youth Parliament
- Website: https://www.ymcabrisbane.org/services/queensland-youth-parliament

The YMCA Queensland Youth Parliament (QYP) is a nonpartisan YMCA run model parliament program and youth organisation, based in Queensland, Australia.

It is one of a number of Australian YMCA Youth Parliaments. Its purpose is to facilitate and encourage political and civic engagement in young Queenslanders as well as promote leadership skills.

== Overview ==
QYP aims to provide a platform for young people to have their say on local, state and federal issues, build skills and parliamentary understanding, while simulating the Queensland Legislative Assembly in Queensland Parliament. The program selects one individual, aged 15 to 25 years old, to represent each electorate in the state, for a total of 93 participants (known as Youth Members).

The main component of the program is Youth Members developing Youth Bills (referred to as Youth Acts once passed) on their portfolio areas. These bills are debated at the Youth Parliament's Sitting week in Queensland Parliament House. Youth Bills that have been passed are signed by the Youth Governor for assent and then referred to the relevant Ministers within the Queensland Government for consideration.

== Executive ==
Queensland Youth Parliament is run by a YMCA-employed Program Coordinator and a team of volunteers called the Executive. The Executive includes portfolio mentors, media officers, a Parliamentary team, a Recreations, Community Engagement, Education and Sponsorship team, and the Youth Governor. The current Youth Governor is Her Excellency, the Honourable Layla Gossage and the current Program Coordinator is Grace Campbell.

=== Other programs ===
Queensland Youth Parliament's Executive runs other programs alongside the Youth Parliament to promote political and civic engagement in young Queenslanders. This includes the "Your Voice Heard Blog" featuring blog posts and opinion pieces from Youth Members and other young Queenslanders, and various summits and forums.

In 2021, the program ran its first ever Regional Tour, aimed at promoting youth engagement with politics in rural areas.

== History ==
The first Australian Youth Parliament was held in Brisbane in 1963 as a one time event, based on the American "YMCA Youth and Government" concept, however Queensland's program didn't begin until much later.

The first session of the YMCA Queensland Youth Parliament was held in 1996 and has been run annually since. The program has completed 31 iterations.

=== Former Youth Governors ===
Year	Youth Governor
2016	Nelson Savanh
2017	Catherine Cassells
2018	Drew Cutler
2019	Alexandria Brown
2020	Jack Hill
2021	Benjamin Crowley
2022	Portia Allison
2023	Jamie Robbins
2024	Jordan Engel
2025	Jasmin Peak
2026	Madison Hilker

=== Notable alumni ===
Alumni of the program include Kate Jones, former Queensland MP and Minister who was Youth Premier when she completed the program.

== Format ==
The program consist of three main phases; Launch Weekend, an interim research and drafting period, and Residential Sitting Week.

In early April, Youth Members attend a 3-day Launch Weekend where they meet other Youth Members, discuss ideas and are educated on the legislative processes of the Legislative Assembly. Parliamentary Portfolios are formed and begin to plan for Youth Bills.

In between Launch Weekend and Residential Sitting Week, the research and drafting phase occurs. Youth Members consult with community, stakeholders and Members of Parliament on their Youth Bills. They then draft the Bill and amendments to the Bill, as well as policy proposals on various topics. Drafting is facilitated by Portfolio Mentors, and assisted by the Queensland Office of Parliamentary Counsel.

Youth Members are encouraged to engage with their community, which may include volunteering or other advocacy work.

The program culminates in a seven-day Residential Sitting Week in September where Youth Members debate their Youth Bills and Matters of Public Importance in Queensland Parliament House. Youth Bills that have been passed are referred to Government and Opposition, with a view to providing politicians and their advisors with practical solutions to the concerns of young Queenslanders.

== Portfolios ==
Youth Members are organised into portfolios based on their areas of interest. In 2026, the portfolios are:

- Portfolio for Aboriginal and Torres Strait Islander Partnerships (ATSIP);
- Portfolio for Regional and Rural Development, Natural Resources and Mines, Primary Industries, Fire, Disaster and Volunteers (FIRRP)
- Portfolio for Justice, Police and Corrective Services, Child Safety and Prevention of Family and Domestic Violence (JPACS);
- Portfolio for Science and Innovation, Energy, Manufacturing (MESI);
- Portfolio for Education and the Arts, Employment and Training, Small and Family Business, Industrial Relations (EATIR);
- Portfolio for the Environment and Tourism, Water, Sport and Racing (WREST);
- Portfolio for Health and Ambulance Services, Families, Seniors and Disability Services, Veterans (FAVHD); and
- Portfolio for State Development, Infrastructure and Planning, Home Ownership, Transport and Main Roads, Housing and Public Works (STORM).

== See also ==
- Junior State of America, a similar organisation
- YMCA Youth Parliament
- YMCA NSW Youth Parliament
- Commonwealth Youth Parliament
