= YMCA NSW Youth Parliament =

Model parliament program in New South Wales, Australia

The Y NSW Youth Parliament

Type
- Type: Bicameral
- Houses: Legislative Assembly Legislative Council

History
- Founded: 2002; 24 years ago

Leadership
- Youth Governor: Jamison Dustin
- Youth Premier: Alyssa Pinchbeck
- Youth Leader of the Opposition: Scarlett Owens

Meeting place
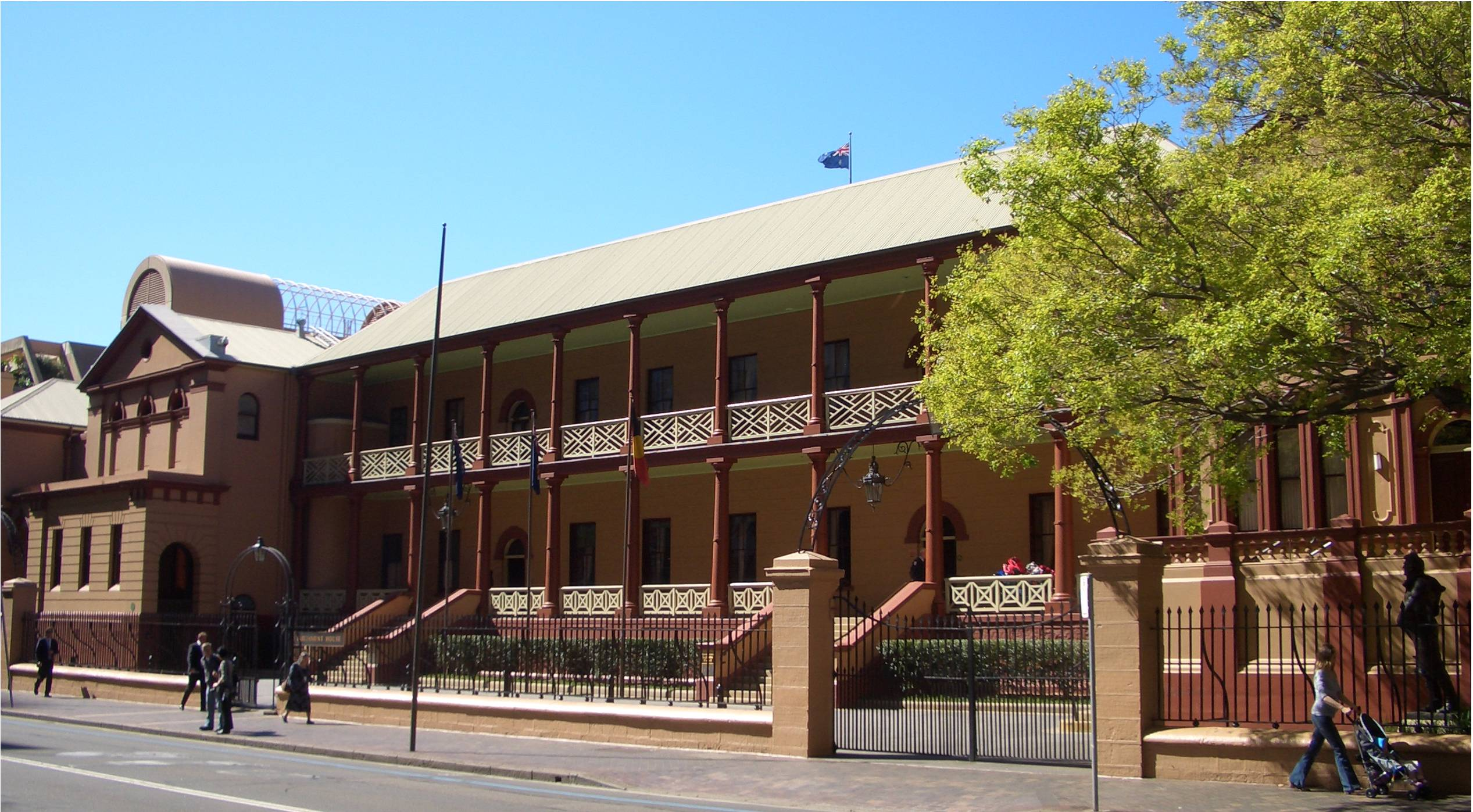
- Parliament House, Sydney, New South Wales

Website
- www.ymcansw.org.au

The New South Wales Youth Parliament is an apolitical YMCA Youth Parliament program coordinated by the YMCA NSW, and acts as an advocacy platform for young people in New South Wales aged 15 to 18. Participants spend time in Committees developing mock Bills, which they debate during a week-long camp in the NSW Parliament. Bills are given Royal Assent by the Youth Governor and handed to the NSW Government and Opposition for consideration.

Notable alumni of the program include Avani Dias, Adam Marshall and Chris Rath.

== Overview ==
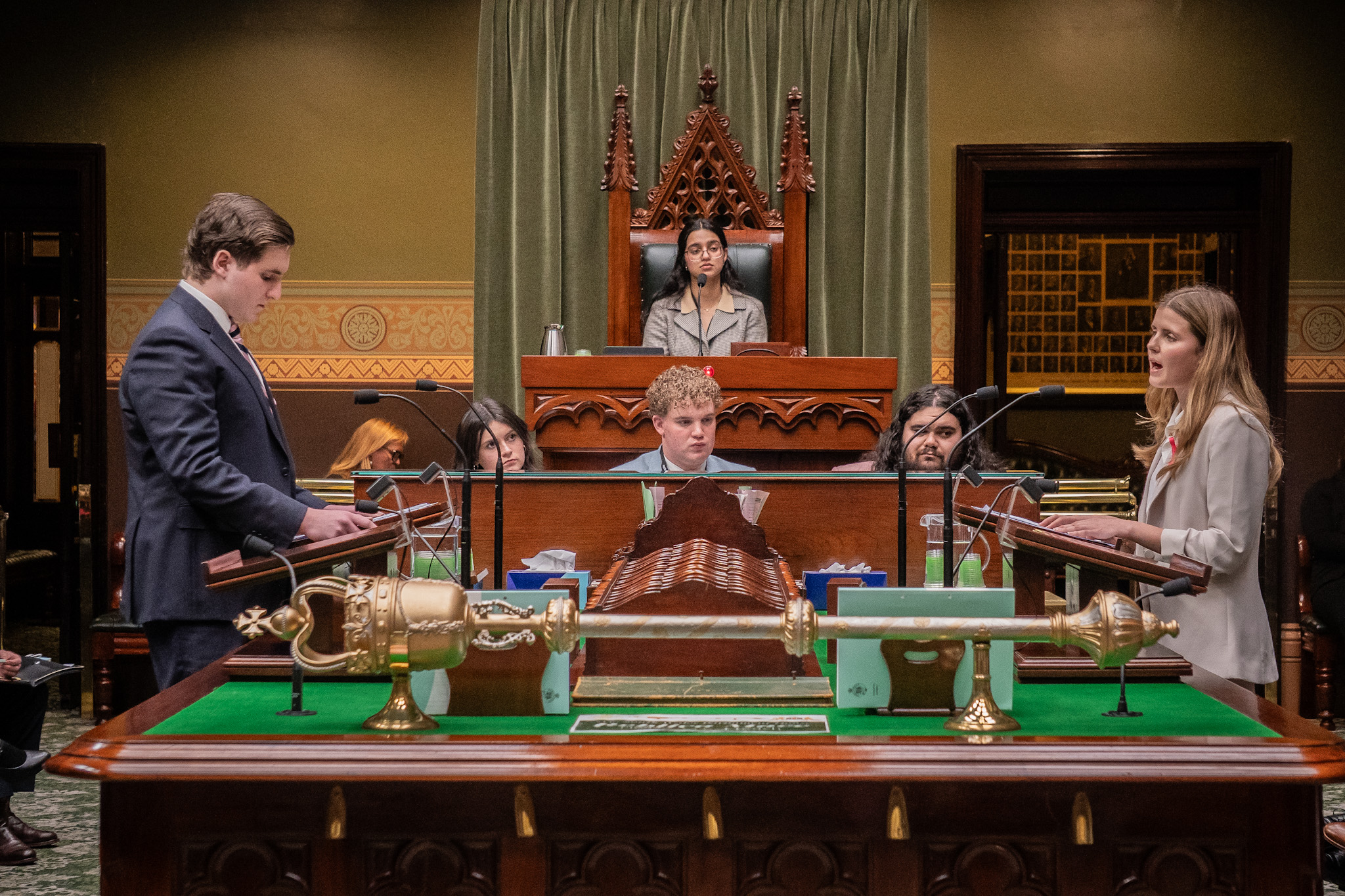
Youth Premier. Julian Newman and Opposition Leader. Zahlia Kelly historically co-sponsor the 2025 National Matter of Public Importance, Women's Health.

The New South Wales Youth Parliament is a YMCA-sponsored youth model parliament program. The program was first launched in 2002, attracting 32 participants representing regional teams from across New South Wales. The program has continued since and is in its 21st year. There is a YMCA Youth Parliament program in every Australian State and Territory.

Young people aged 15 to 18 may apply for the program or seek selection from their local MP or MLC. Successful applicants are then allocated committees according to their preferences and begin to create a Bill which focuses on a current issue in New South Wales.

Participants meet during a weekend—long training camp where they learn about the legislative process. Participants then spend time in the Legislative Assembly debating, amending and voting on Bills and general motions, including Question Time and a Matter of Public Importance. Approximately six pieces of Y NSW Youth Parliament legislation have been passed into NSW law, including the Domestic Violence Disclosure Scheme.

== Youth Leadership ==
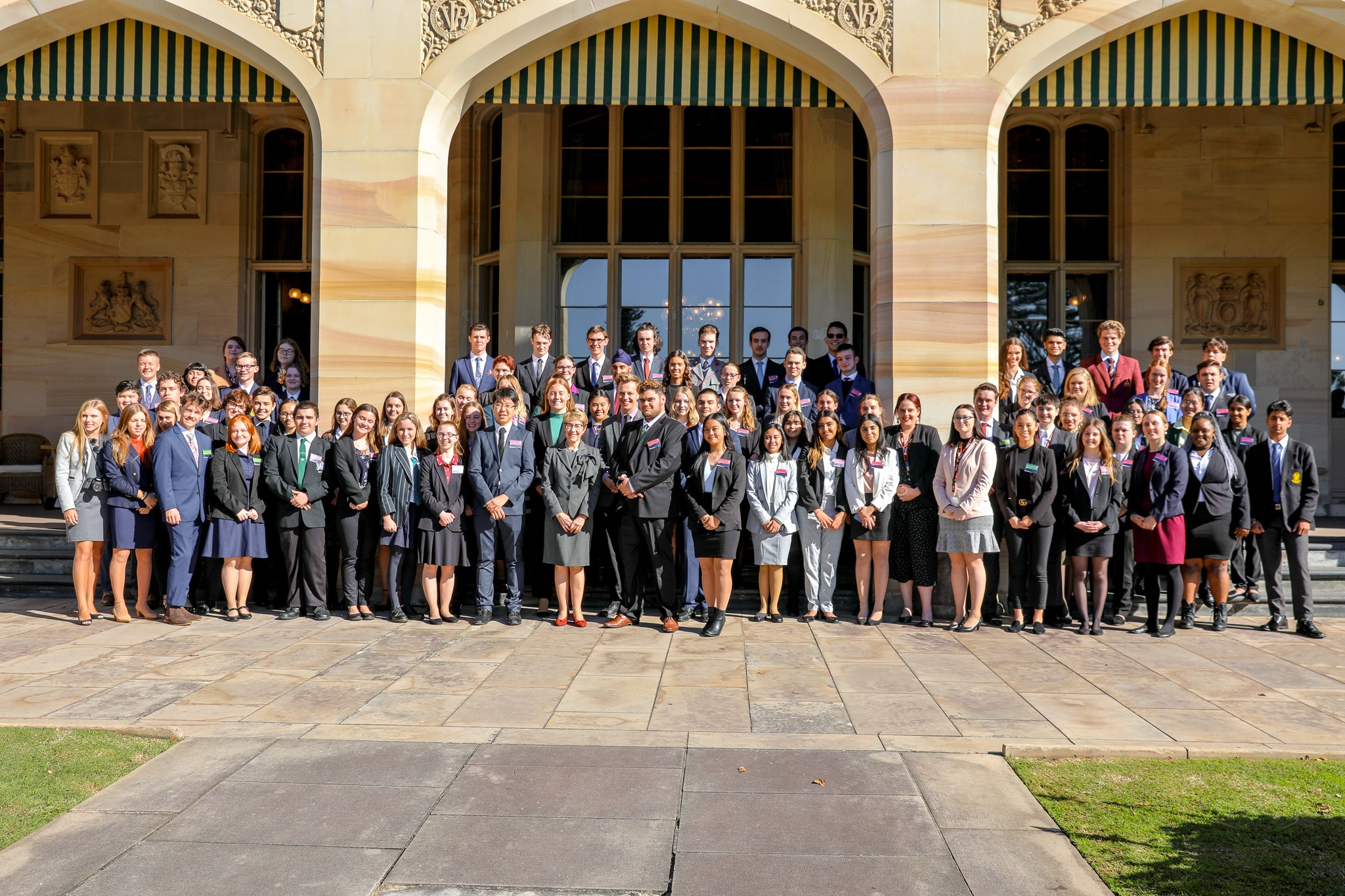
Participants of 2019 Youth Parliament at Government House with Margaret Beazley AC QC (Governor of NSW)

During the Training Camp, Youth MP's may nominate themselves for leadership positions including Premier, Deputy Premier, Opposition Leader, Leader of the House/Manager of Opposition Business, and Party Whips. A vote of the participant body is then held to determine the leadership team for the respective calendar year. With the introduction of a bicameral parliament, further leadership positions have been made available to serve the Legislative Council, such as Leader of the Government in the Legislative Council.

Youth Parliamentarians also have the opportunity to become either Ministers in the Government or Shadow Ministers of the Opposition. Those elevated to these positions are elected by their peers in portfolios to take on the role of lead sponsor or refuter of their respective portfolio. This is replicated in the Legislative Council with chairpersons of committees and ministers representing legislative assembly portfolios. There are additional leadership roles, such as government whip, opposition whip (in both houses) and regional ministers (in the legislative assembly).

Participants also have the chance to attend the Governors Reception at Government House.

List of Former Executive Leaders of the Y NSW Youth Parliament program
Year	Premier	Deputy Premier	Opposition Leader	Deputy Opposition Leader	Leader of the House	Manager of Opposition Business	Government Whip	Opposition Whip
2026	Alyssa Pinchbeck (Member for Hornsby)	Amelie Kemper-Massie (Member for Manly)	Scarlett Owens (Member for The Entrance)	Rohan Arianayagam (Member for Willoughby)	Billy Bofinger (Member for Cronulla) Harry Mcrae (Member for Davidson)	David Huang (Member for Holsworthy) Mollie Webb (Member for Balmain)	Rowon Bienke von Freyhold (Member for Ballina) Mahika Rahman (Member for Camden)	Taylor Darr (Member for Miranda) Tuyvan Mai (Member for Fairfield)
2025	Julian Newman (Member for Manly)	Eliza Tait (Member for Coogee)	Zahlia Kelly (Member for Bega)	Jamison Dustin (Member for Riverstone)	Patrick Jones (Member for Ballina)	Aryan Ghosh (Member for Kellyville)	Chantilly Ho (Member for North Shore)	Aarushi Duggal (Member for Londonderry)
2024	Princess Delany (Member for Kogarah)	Matthew Hayes (Member for Wahroonga)	Isabella Chen (Member for Auburn)	Finlay Cassidy (Member for Kiama)	Marty Davies (Member for Orange)	Johnson Tang (Member for Epping)	Aled Stephens (Member for Penrith)	Cindy Li (Member for Vaucluse)
2023	Noah Smith (Member for Pittwater)	Rachel Lao (Member for Parramatta)	James Paterson (Member for Davidson)	Laura Strawbridge (Member for Wahroonga)	Janet Zheng (Member for Willoughby)	Jewel Osborne (Member for Mount Druitt)	Karin Rezkalla (Member for Wagga Wagga)	Elise Lang (Member for Lismore)
2022	Ned Graham (Member for Newtown)	Justin Qin (Member for Ku-Ring-Gai)	Jayden Delbridge (Member for Wyong)	Chelsea Burgess Hannon (Member for Wagga Wagga)	Elyssa Khaoula (Member for Liverpool)	Vincent Rummery (Member for Blue Mountains)	Stella Jeong (Member for Castle Hill)	Leyton Croft (Member for Northern Tablelands)
2021	Indigo Lee-Wilson (Member for Ku-Ring-Gai)	Abbey Dawson (Member for Bega)	Samuel Barry (Member for Upper Hunter)	Ethan Floyd (Member for Cessnock)	Cameron Last (Member for Ryde)	Brooklyn Rullis (Member for Miranda)	Connor Burke (Member for Mulgoa)	Annabelle Shannon (Member for Barwon)
2020	During 2020, the Y NSW Youth Parliament Program was canceled for the first time due to the COVID-19 pandemic.							
2019	Hamani Tanginoa (Member for Campbelltown)	Kyla Rivera (Member for Heffron)	Luca Corby (Member for Keira)	Matthew Krishna (Member for Newtown)	Benjamin Capovilla (Member for Holsworthy)			
2018	Benjamin Capovilla (Member for Holsworthy)							
2017	Lucy Witherdin (Member for Newcastle)	Felix Faber	Jeremiah Edagbami (Member for Camden)					
2016	Abby Butler (Member for Newcastle)	Matilda Conlan (Member for Murray)						
2015	Iman Salim Ali Farrar (Member for East Hills)		Jeffrey Khoo (Member for Ryde)	Hugh McClure (Member for Keira)				
2014	Arlo Meylan (Member for Newcastle)	Cameron Allan (Member for Newcastle)	Harry Gregg (Member for Lismore)	Tom Williams	Jack Wilson			
2013	Theodora Von Arnim (Member for Marrickville)	Dempsey Bloom (Member for Wollondilly)	Matthew Campbell (Member for Hawkesbury)	Alexandra Saliba (Member for Shellharbour)	Annie Zhou (Member for Ryde)			
2012	Joshua Favaloro (Member for Balmain)	Leah Emmanuel (Member for Canterbury)	Geeth Geeganage (Member for Blacktown)	Paulina Krumanaite (Member for Wakehurst)	Tina Zhou (Member for Marrickville)			
2011	Elle Griffin (Member for Manly)	Daniel McNamara	Istiak Ahmed (Member for Macquarie Fields)	Blake Osmond (Member for Wollongong)	Matt Oreshkin			
2010	Matt Higgs (Member for Blue Mountains)	Emily Lecky (Member for Tamworth)	Farah Abdel (Member for Lakemba)	Charles Witherdin	Piero Craney			
2009	Samir Kinger							
2008	Sean Szabo (Member for Hornsby)							
2007	Vivek Bhatt (Member for Wollondilly)							
2006	Rebecca Dooley (Member for Hornsby)	Tim Green (Member for Ballina)	David Zabell (Member for Keira)	Joseph Prevedello (Member for Burrinjuck)				
2005	Sarah Dwyer (Member for Ballina)	Elle Morgan-Thomas (Member for Bathurst)						
DATA UNAVAILABLE DURING THIS PERIOD (2003 – 2004)
2002	Adam Marshall (Member for Northern Tablelands)							

== Youth Governor ==
The position of Youth Governor, voted in and selected by the volunteer taskforce and participants, is charged with overseeing and representing the program as well as signing off on bills that are passed.

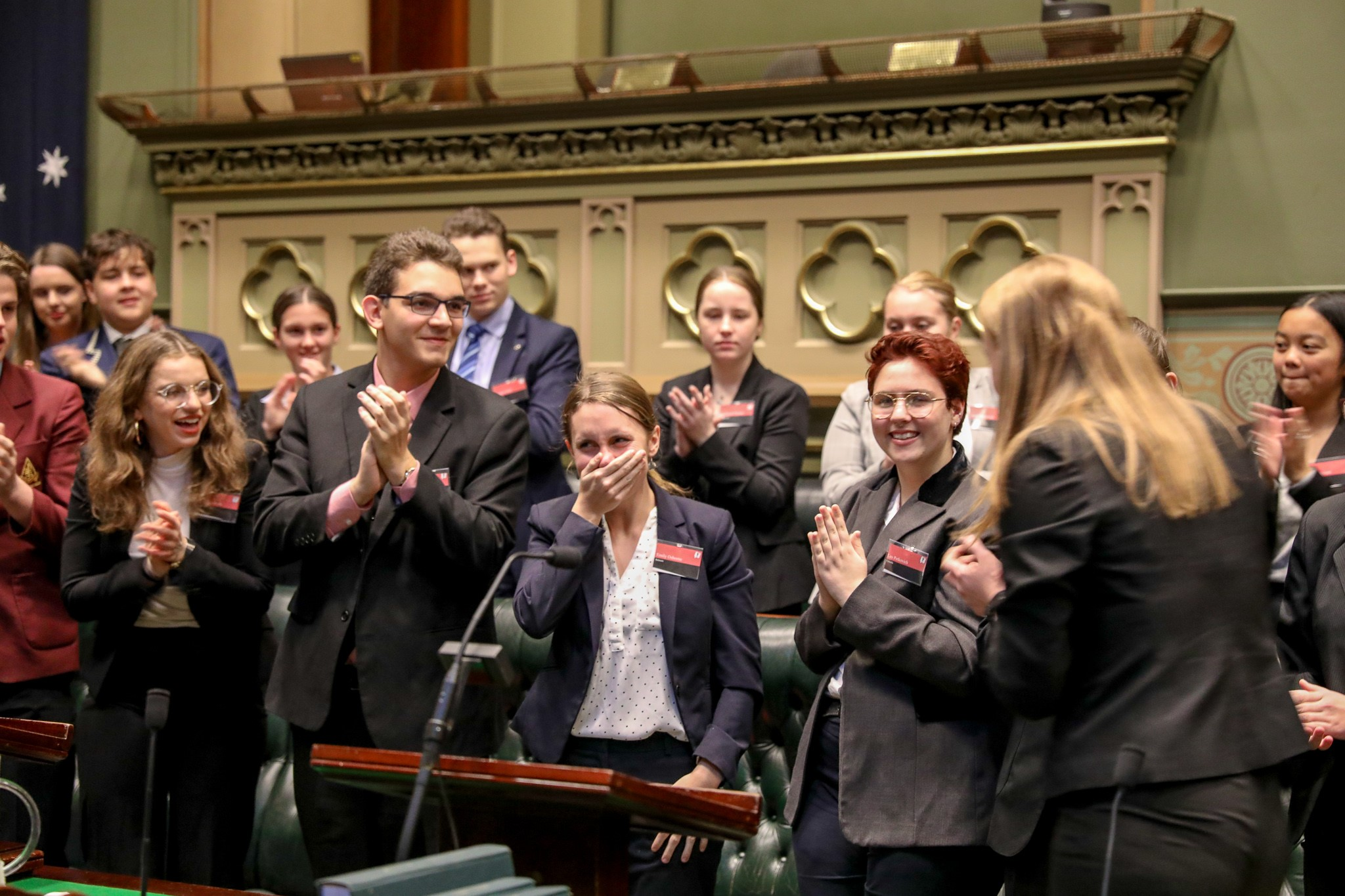
Hon. Emily Osborne MP, 2019 Member for Balmain being announced as NSW's 17th Youth Governor.

=== Former Youth Governors ===
No.	Youth Governor	Sworn in	Term	Electorate	Notes
1	Jenny McInnes	July 2002	2003	–	Inaugural Youth Governor
2	–	July 2003	2004	–	No data for this period
3	–	July 2004	2005	–	No data for this period
4	Deborah Horsley	July 2005	2006	Ballina
5	Swaren Veygal	July 2006	2007	Keira
6	Tim Green	July 2007	2008	Ballina
7	Jessica Priebee	July 2008	2009	–
8	Nick Calleja	July 2009	2010	–
9	Charles Witherdin-Costigan	July 2010	2011	–
10	Blake Osmond	July 2011	2012	Wollongong
11	Geeth Geegenage	July 2012	2013	Blacktown
12	Brydan Toner	July 2013	2014	South Coast
13	Arlo Alexander-Meylan	July 2014	2015	–
14	Jacqueline Willing	July 2015	2016	Newcastle
15	Sophia-Rose Castro	July 2016	2017	–
16	Sam Harris	July 2017	2018	Newcastle
17	Sophie Macdonald	July 2018	2019	–
18	Emily Osborne	July 2019	2020	Balmain
19	Holly Mack	December 2021	2021/22	Wagga Wagga	Interim Governor due to COVID-19
20	Abbey Dawson	January 2022	2022	Bega
21	Myles Waciega	July 2022	2023	Seven Hills
22	Joshua Shaw	July 2023	2024	Wagga Wagga
23	Lian Sequeira	July 2024	2025	Gosford
24	Jamison Dustin	July 2025	2026	Riverstone

== Taskforce ==
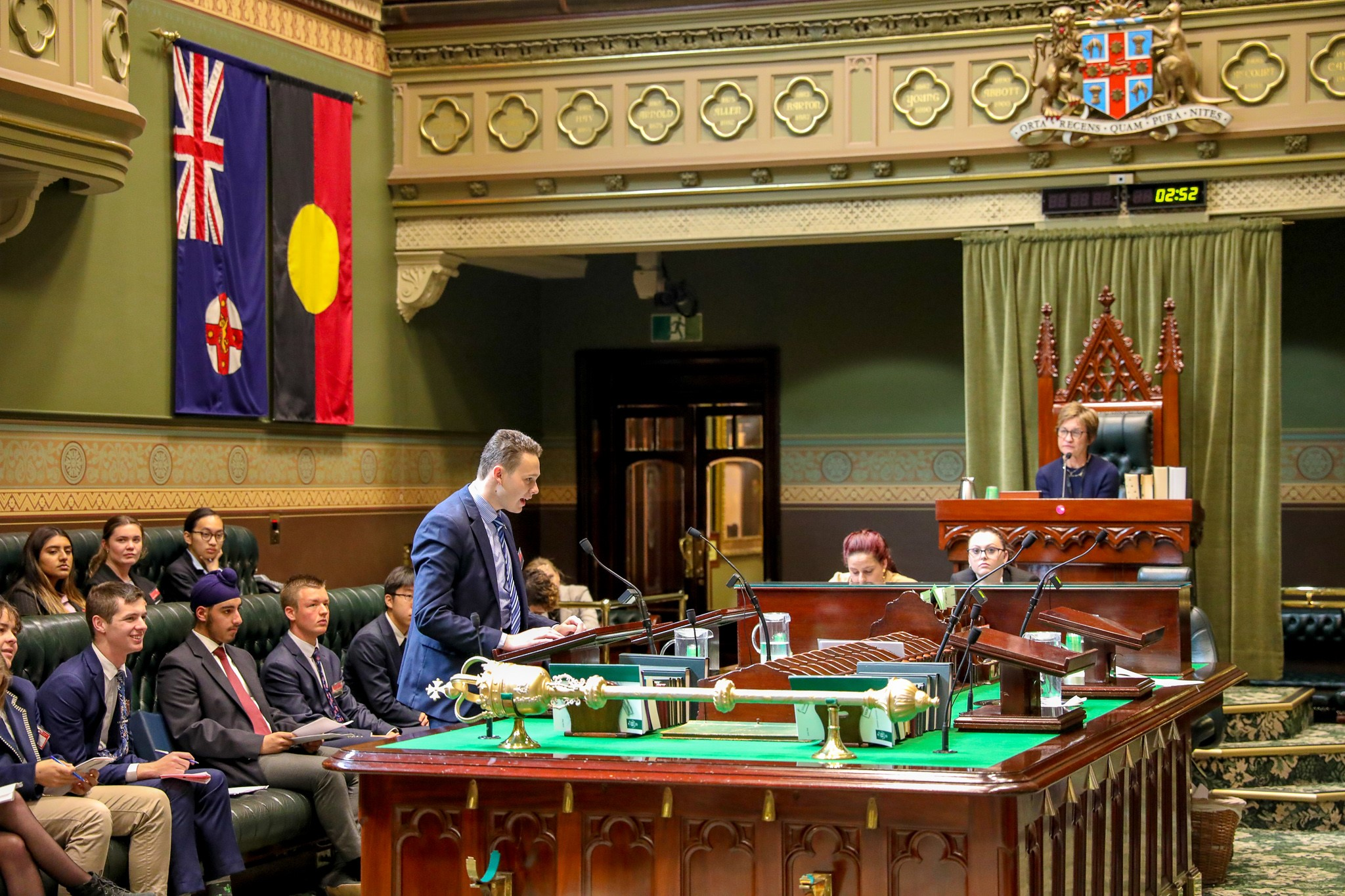
Hon. Lachlan Hyde MP, 2019 Member for Cabramatta and Minister for Agriculture & Water debates the Innovation and Technology in Agriculture Bill 2019

The program is facilitated and supported by a volunteer taskforce of young people aged between 18 and 25 years, known as 'taskies.'

Taskforce members are typically past participants. As the YMCA NSW Youth Parliament is the only Youth Parliament across Australia that does not receive funding from the State Government, YMCA funding and the volunteer taskforce continue to run Youth Parliament. The taskies are the essential for the operation of the program.

== Notable Past Programs ==
In 2012, the Youth Parliament passed the Same-Sex Marriage Matter of Public Importance (MPI) with 70 ayes to 11 noes, with the largest majority of all the Youth Parliaments in Australia which were debating this issue. The young parliamentary members represented the spectrum of opinions. One member stated his belief in the importance of the MPI as a member of the gay community, while another voted against the MPI due to religious beliefs. In 2013, the Parliamentary and Legal Reform Committee Debated the Marriage Equality Bill 2013. This passed unanimously with 72 ayes to 0 noes. Following the passing of the Bill, the chamber began to sing 'Advance Australia Fair'. The Bill also passed in the Legislative Council with 40 ayes to 4 noes.

In 2019, the Aboriginal Affairs Committee debated a bill to establish an Aboriginal and Torres Strait Islander Advisory Committee within all NSW schools. This is to help improve the cultural standpoints and enable self-determination of Aboriginal people and their communities. This passed unanimously with 67 ayes to 0 noes. The bill was even more significant with the programs first ever Aboriginal premier ushering it through the chamber.

During the 2021/22 program, members from the Aboriginal Affairs, Women's Affairs, and Justice committees united in delivering their Private Members' Statements on the issue of Australia's national public holiday (26 January). The Youth MPs were commended for their bipartisanship and collaboration in uniting on such an important and pressing issue. Notably, two Youth MP's, Samuel Barry, Member for The Upper Hunter, and Zaccary Lancaster, Member for Holsworthy, used their Private Members Statements to come out in support of the current date of Australia Day. The Member for The Upper Hunter stated that "We mustn’t be afraid to face our history head on, being accepting of our past yet moving forward as one people".

In 2021, the Aboriginal Affairs Committee advocated for a Bill to implement a framework for cultural education within the NSW juvenile justice system. The Aboriginal Education in Juvenile Detention Bill 2021 outlined the committee's vision for fair and equitable treatment of incarcerated Aboriginal and Torres Strait Islander young people. The Bill was passed unanimously and unamended. In March 2022, the Bill was officially presented to The Hon. Ben Franklin, MLC.

Historically, the YMCA NSW Youth Parliament also offered the Press Gallery program, an internship program for eligible students facilitating experience in journalism, advocacy, public relations and political reporting as part of the Youth & Government suite of programs.

== See also ==
- YMCA Youth Parliament
- YMCA Queensland Youth Parliament
- YMCA Youth and Government, United States
