= Norm Foster (politician) =

Australian politician

The Honourable Norman Foster OAM
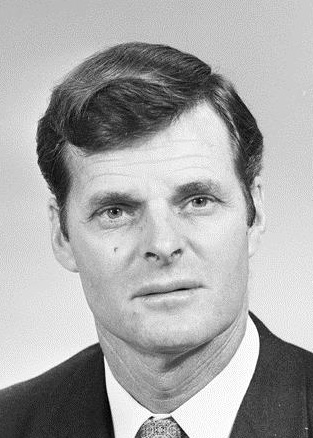

Member of the Australian Parliament for Sturt
- In office 25 October 1969 – 2 December 1972
- Preceded by: Ian Wilson
- Succeeded by: Ian Wilson

Member of the South Australian Legislative Council
- In office 12 July 1975 – 6 November 1982

Personal details
- Born: 12 March 1921 Adelaide, South Australia
- Died: 19 November 2006 (aged 85) Adelaide, South Australia
- Party: Labor Party
- Occupation: Dock worker

Norman Kenneth Foster OAM (12 March 1921 – 19 November 2006) was a Labor member of the Australian House of Representatives for the seat of Sturt from 1969 to 1972 and then the South Australian Legislative Council from 1975 to 1982. He also served as a signaller with the 2/10th Battalion in North Africa, Papua and Borneo during World War II, and was mentioned in dispatches for his bravery in action.

== Early life ==
Norman was born in Adelaide and left school at 13. He worked as a labourer until he enlisted in the Second Australian Imperial Force's 2/10th Battalion in 1939 at the outbreak of World War II. He served in England, Tobruk, New Guinea and Borneo, where he was mentioned in dispatches for bravery in action as a signaller. After the war he worked on the docks in Port Adelaide and became a leader of the Waterside Workers' Federation and president of the Trades and Labor Council in 1964.

== Political career ==
He won the federal seat of Sturt from Liberal incumbent Ian Wilson at the 1969 election with a 50 percent primary and 50.5 percent two-party vote from a 15 percent two-party swing. Foster's victory in the historically blue-ribbon Liberal seat was part of an 18-seat swing to Labor that nearly ended the Coalition's record tenure in government. However, Wilson won the seat back at the 1972 election from a 2.7 percent swing even though Labor won government. Foster was the last Labor MP to represent Sturt until Claire Clutterham won the seat in the 2025 Labor landslide election win.

Foster then served in the South Australian Legislative Council from 1975 to 1982 and was probably best known for his support of the Tonkin Liberal government's legislation in 1982 to allow the Roxby Downs uranium mine. The legislation was very controversial, and was opposed at the time by Labor. Foster resigned from the Labor Party just before he crossed the floor to give the final vote required to pass the legislation. He ran unsuccessfully for the Legislative Council as an independent Labor candidate in 1982. His ALP membership was reinstated in 1988.

Foster died in Adelaide and was survived by his wife, five children, seven grandchildren and four great-grandchildren.

== Footnotes ==
Parliament of Australia
Preceded by Ian Wilson	Member for Sturt; 1969–1972	Succeeded by Ian Wilson
