= NIOA =

Australian weapons company

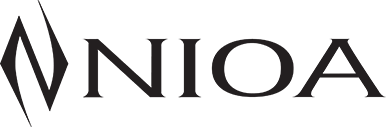
- Industry: Firearms, Defence, Law Enforcement, Sporting and Outdoors
- Founded: 1973
- Founder: Bill Nioa
- Headquarters: Brisbane, Queensland, Australia
- Key people: Robert Nioa (CEO); Ben James (NIOA ANZ CEO)
- Products: Firearms, ammunition, optics and accessories
- Owner: Robert Nioa
- Subsidiaries: NIOA Australia & New Zealand; Australian Missile Corporation; Barrett Firearms Manufacturing; Rheinmetall NIOA Munitions Joint Venture (RNM)
- Website: nioa.com.au

NIOA is an Australian armaments and munitions company, headquartered in Brisbane, Queensland, Australia. Owned by the Nioa family, it is a privately held company which is a supplier of arms and ammunition to the sporting, law enforcement and military markets. Its founder and CEO, Robert Nioa, is the son-in-law of Australian federal politician Bob Katter.

== History ==
NIOA was involved with importing Adler shotguns into Australia during the 2010s.

On 28 July 2016, NIOA was awarded a contract to supply 40 mm automatic grenade launchers to the Australian Army.

On 15 November 2017, NIOA was selected by the New Zealand Defence Force to supply weapons. On 5 December 2017, NIOA signed a contract with the Australian Department of Defence to supply the Australian Defence Force with multiple types of ammunition.

On 23 January 2018, NIOA was awarded a contract by the Australian Army to supply 155 mm artillery ammunitions.

On 1 November 2019, former Australian politician David Feeney was appointed to the advisory board of NIOA.

On 29 June 2020, NIOA agreed to enter into a joint tenancy, alongside Thales Australia, of the government-owned munitions factory in Benalla. On 9 December 2020, NIOA entered into an agreement with Olin Corporation to supply the Australian Defence Force with small arms ammunition.

On 3 June 2021, NIOA partnered with Black Sky Aerospace and Quickstep in their bid under the Australian Missile Corporation for the Australian Government's sovereign guided missiles project.

On 17 January 2023, NIOA acquired full ownership of Barrett Firearms Manufacturing, an American rifle manufacturer.

== See also ==
- List of firearm brands
- List of modern armament manufacturers
- List of companies named after people
