= Mia Handshin =

Australian activist

Mia Handshin (born in Adelaide, Australia) is an Adelaide-based political activist and a former columnist for The Advertiser newspaper in South Australia, contributing a weekly column to the opinion section from 1997 to 2007. She is an associate director of the consulting firm Government Relations Australia, and was an adviser in the Adelaide office of federal sports minister Kate Ellis. She was the unsuccessful Australian Labor Party candidate for the 2007 federal election in the electorate of Sturt. Handshin is a Program Manager for the Leaders Institute of South Australia and the Presiding Member of the board of the Environment Protection Authority from 25 October 2012, with her appointment expired on 24 October 2015.

== Youth activism ==
At the age of fourteen she wrote a speech on the concept of a Children's National Council, which was delivered in Federal Parliament, Canberra by Rod Sawford MP.

=== Local ===
In 1992, Handshin was one of the instigators of a Youth Action Group, Tangent, in her local council area.

=== Federal ===
In 1992, she was awarded an Australia Day Young Citizen of the year for her work in facilitating the involvement of young people in council decision making. In 1994, she became involved in the campaign to have the voting age lowered to 16 and the National Children's and Youth Law Centre's National Conference. That same year she attended the Queen's Trust National Capital Seminar with 100 other young Australians.

In November 1997, Handshin won the Community Service Award in the SA Young Australian of the Year Awards. In the same year, Handshin was elected Youth Governor through the YMCA Youth Parliament Program. She went on to be joint co-ordinator of the program in 1998 and was later appointed Governor General of the National Youth Parliament. Mia was appointed by the Prime Minister to be the South Australian youth delegate to the Constitutional Convention on Australia becoming a republic in Canberra, February 1998.

She held the position of Vice President of the Youth Affairs Council of South Australia from 1998 until 2000 and was a member of the Management and Executive committees of YACSA from 1995 until 2002.

She again won this award, being named the 1999 Young South Australian of The Year and was a national finalist at the Awards in Canberra.

=== International ===
Handshin was chosen to attend The World Summit of Children held in Taiwan in 1997 and as Australia's representative to the First International Commonwealth Parliamentary Association's Youth Parliament in Manchester at which she was elected Prime Minister.

== Education ==
In 2000, Handshin graduated from the University of Adelaide with a Bachelor of Law (with honors) and a Bachelor of Arts.

== Adult career ==
Handshin was a board member of the Constitutional Centenary Foundation in 2000 and 2001 through which she participated regularly in debate, discussion and formulation of Australia Constitutional reform possibilities.

She was co-chair of the Federation Centenary Youth Advisory Committee. She was the SA UNESCO Youth Network representative from 1999 until 2001. In 1999, she attended the first National Youth Roundtable, the Millennium Young People's Congress in Hawaii and the UNESCO General Assembly Youth Forum in Paris. She represented Australia at the Racism: Stop It! Action 2000, Tour and Forum in Canada and was a delegate to the Young People's Conference on the Commercial Sexual Exploitation of Children in Manila, Philippines.

In April 2003, Handshin completed a 2-month internship with the International Crisis Group in Brussels, Belgium. In 2005, she attended the first Social Artistry Training Intensive on Fraser Island, Australia, the first non-UNDP training program in Social Artistry outside the United States of America and was an elected member of the Governing Council for the University of Adelaide. Handshin is currently a member of the Friends of Plan Australia (SA) committee.

Handshin's founded Mana of Speaking in 2005 as a public speaking and consultancy business.

Handshin was nominated as a high-profile candidate in the 2007 election, standing for the Australian Labor Party (ALP) in the traditionally fairly safe Liberal federal seat of Sturt against incumbent Christopher Pyne. Prior to her nomination she had been a member of the ALP for three years. Although she was unable to win the seat, Handshin came close, receiving a 49.1 percent two-party vote from a 5.6 percent two-party swing. In August 2009, Handshin announced that she would not be contesting the seat of Sturt at the 2010 election.
