= Division of Sturt =

Australian federal electoral division

Coordinates: 34.894°S 138.674°E

Sturt Australian House of Representatives Division
- Interactive map of boundaries since the 2019 federal election
- Created: 1949
- MP: Claire Clutterham
- Party: Labor
- Namesake: Charles Sturt
- Electors: 130,340 (2025)
- Area: 97 km^{2} (37.5 sq mi)
- Demographic: Inner metropolitan
Electorates around Sturt:
Makin	Makin	Mayo
Adelaide	Sturt	Mayo
Boothby	Boothby	Mayo

The Division of Sturt is an Australian electoral division in South Australia. It was proclaimed at the South Australian redistribution of 11 May 1949. Sturt was named for Captain Charles Sturt, a nineteenth century British officer and explorer.

== Boundaries ==
Current boundaries see Sturt covering an area of approximately 97 km² east of the city, from Oakden and Hope Valley in the north to Glen Osmond in the south, taking in the foothills of the Mount Lofty Ranges. Suburbs include Athelstone, Burnside, Campbelltown, Dernancourt, Frewville, Gilles Plains, Glen Osmond, Glenside, Glynde, Hectorville, Highbury, Hillcrest, Holden Hill, Hope Valley, Kensington, Klemzig, Magill, Marden, Oakden, Paradise, Tranmere and parts of Payneham and Rostrevor.

== History ==
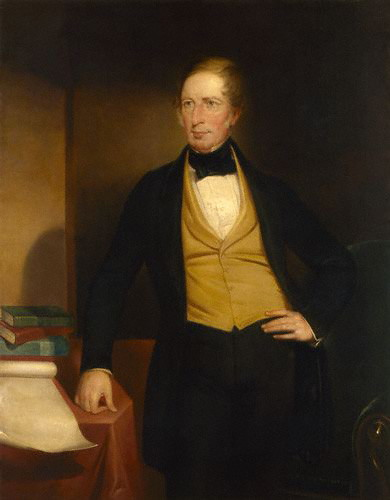
Charles Sturt, the division's namesake

The Division of Sturt was proclaimed at the redistribution of 11 May 1949, and was first contested at the 1949 election, when the number of electorates was increased to 10, as a fairly safe Labor seat with a notional 6.1 percent two-party margin. Boundaries at the seat's creation saw it take in the sub divisions of Salisbury and Northfield from the Division of Wakefield to the north and to the south the sub divisions of Magill and Burnside from the Division of Boothby.

For all but four of its first 44 years, it was dominated by the Liberal political dynasty of Keith Wilson and his son, Ian. Keith Wilson won the seat in 1949 with a marginal 2.8 percent two-party vote from an 8.9 percent two-party swing as part of the massive Liberal victory of that year. He was unseated by Labor challenger Norman Makin at the 1954 election. However, ahead of the 1955 election, a redistribution transferred most of Sturt's Labor-friendly northern portion to the newly created Division of Bonython, created due to an increase in northern Adelaide's population. This turned Sturt from a three percent marginal Labor seat to a 2.4 percent marginal Liberal seat. Makin opted to transfer to Bonython, and Keith Wilson retook Sturt in 1955 with a healthy 7.9 percent two-party swing, turning it into a safe Liberal seat in one stroke. He was reelected without serious difficulty until handing Sturt to Ian in 1966. Norm Foster defeated Ian at the 1969 election, but Ian regained the seat at the 1972 election even as Labor won government.

Ian was a key early member of the progressive Liberal Movement faction within the Liberal Party. However, he remained with the Liberals when the Liberal Movement became a separate party, and eventually served as a minister in the last term of the Fraser government. The Liberal Movement ran a candidate in Sturt in the 1974 election, polling 7.2 percent, much of which derived from Wilson’s vote. The Wilson dynasty ended at the 1993 election, when Ian was defeated for preselection by future Minister Christopher Pyne.

Sturt was significantly redistributed prior to the 1993 election, reducing the Liberal margin from a fairly safe 7.7 percent two-party margin to a marginal notional 4.7 percent two-party margin. Nevertheless, Pyne retained the seat with a small swing in his favour.

The Liberal Movement's successor party, the Australian Democrats, traditionally polled well in Sturt, highlighted by 13.5 percent at their first showing in the 1977 election and 15 percent in the 1990 election, the best result by a minor party in Sturt. However, the Democrats vote later dropped sharply, they gained only 2.26 percent in the 2004 election. The party was deregistered in 2015. Additionally, an independent Liberal contested Sturt at the 1993 election, polling a respectable 14.6 percent. Pyne retained the seat until his retirement in 2019.

Since 1984, federal electoral division boundaries in Australia have been determined at redistributions by a redistribution committee appointed by the Australian Electoral Commission. Redistributions occur for the boundaries of divisions in a particular state, and they occur every seven years, or sooner if a state's representation entitlement changes or when divisions of a state are malapportioned.

=== Recent elections ===
==== 2007 election ====
Pyne came close to losing Sturt at the 2007 election to Labor candidate Mia Handshin, after suffering a 5.9 percent two-party swing to finish with a 0.9 percent two-party margin (856 votes), which made Sturt the most marginal seat in South Australia. Prior to the pre-selection of Handshin, No Pokies MP Nick Xenophon had been considering running in the seat as an independent, before deciding to run for the Senate instead. At the 2010 election, Pyne increased his two-party vote to 53.4 percent, which saw neighbouring Boothby become South Australia's most marginal seat. Pyne increased his two-party margin to 10.1 percent in the 2013 election and was elevated to the Cabinet of Australia.

==== 2016 election and Xenophon ====
Nick Xenophon confirmed in December 2014 that the Nick Xenophon Team (NXT) party would field lower and upper house candidates around the country at the 2016 federal election, citing the government's ambiguity on the Collins-class submarine replacement project as the primary motivation.

Even before the NXT candidate was announced, a ReachTEL opinion poll of 700 Sturt voters conducted during July 2015 put NXT on 38 percent, the Liberals on 30.8 (−23.6) percent and Labor on 17.4 (−11.5) percent. On the two-party vote, the Liberals were on 52 (−8.1) percent to Labor on 48 (+8.1) percent, however, with NXT leading the primary vote, the decisive two-candidate vote put NXT on a winning 62 percent to the Liberals on 38 (−22) percent. ABC psephologist Antony Green's 2016 federal election guide for South Australia stated NXT had a "strong chance of winning lower house seats and three or four Senate seats".

In late 2015, NXT nominated Sturt as their top South Australian lower house target and announced Matthew Wright as their NXT candidate in Sturt. Wright is an emergency physician at the Flinders Medical Centre who has also worked for humanitarian projects in the Solomon Islands, Papua New Guinea and East Timor.

A ReachTEL opinion poll in Sturt of 762 voters conducted by robocall on 9 June during the 2016 election campaign found NXT and the Liberals neck-and-neck.

Pyne retained the seat for the Liberals with a 55.9 percent two-party vote from a 4.2 percent two-party swing, reducing the seat from a safe to marginal status.

==== 2019/2022 elections ====
In May 2019, Christopher Pyne decided not to contest at the 2019 Election, and James Stevens assumed office. Following the loss of Boothby in 2022, Sturt was the only Liberal-held seat in Adelaide.

==== 2025 election ====
On 6 June 2024, Labor announced that councilor Claire Clutterham would run against Stevens at the next election, as a newly appointed Labor candidate. Katie McCusker contested the seat for the Australian Greens. At the 2025 election, Labor won Sturt for the first time since the 1969 election and the third time ever, with Liberal incumbent Stevens losing to Labor's Clutterham.

The result in Sturt left the Liberals completely shut out in the Adelaide metropolitan area for the first time since the 1946 election. Furthermore, the Liberals won just two of the 400+ metropolitan election-day booths across the seven Adelaide-based seats — One Tree Hill in Spence, and Unley Park in the Division of Adelaide.

== Members ==
Image	Member	Party	Term	Notes
	Keith Wilson (1900–1987)	Liberal	10 December 1949 – 29 May 1954	Previously a member of the Senate. Lost seat
	Norman Makin (1889–1982)	Labor	29 May 1954 – 10 December 1955	Previously held the Division of Hindmarsh. Transferred to the Division of Bonython
	Sir Keith Wilson (1900–1987)	Liberal	10 December 1955 – 31 October 1966	Retired. Son was Ian Wilson
	Ian Wilson (1932–2013)	Liberal	26 November 1966 – 25 October 1969	Lost seat
	Norm Foster (1921–2006)	Labor	25 October 1969 – 2 December 1972	Lost seat. Later elected to the South Australian Legislative Council in 1975
	Ian Wilson (1932–2013)	Liberal	2 December 1972 – 8 February 1993	Served as minister under Fraser. Lost preselection and retired. Father was Sir Keith Wilson
	Christopher Pyne (1967–)	Liberal	13 March 1993 – 11 April 2019	Served as minister under Howard, Abbott, Turnbull and Morrison. Retired
	James Stevens (1983–)	Liberal	18 May 2019 – 3 May 2025	Lost seat
	Claire Clutterham (1982–)	Labor	3 May 2025 – present	Incumbent

== Election results ==
2025 Australian federal election: Sturt
Party	Candidate	Votes	%	±%
Labor	Claire Clutterham	41,333	35.29	+4.63
Liberal	James Stevens	40,228	34.34	−8.80
Greens	Katie McCusker	18,295	15.62	−0.77
Independent	Verity Cooper	8,413	7.18	+7.18
One Nation	Peter Bogatec	4,035	3.44	+0.87
Trumpet of Patriots	Nicholas Duffield	2,553	2.18	+1.51
Family First	Mervin Joshua	2,280	1.95	+1.95
Total formal votes		117,137	96.66	+2.15
Informal votes		4,049	3.34	−2.15
Turnout		121,186	93.01	+0.63
Two-party-preferred result
Labor	Claire Clutterham	66,326	56.62	+7.07
Liberal	James Stevens	50,811	43.38	−7.07
Labor gain from Liberal		Swing	+7.07	

== Historical boundaries ==
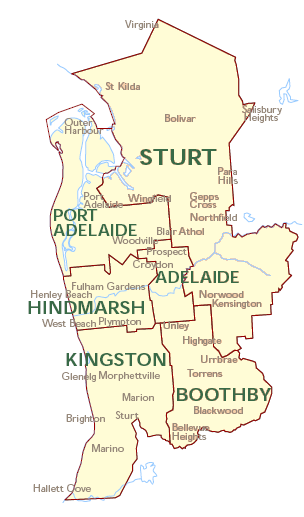
Sturt in 1951

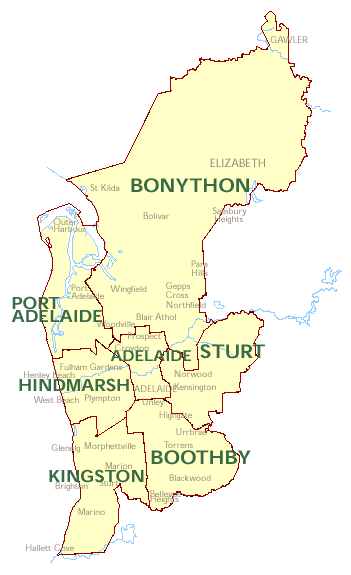
Sturt in 1967
