= James Stevens (Australian politician) =

Australian politician (born 1983)

Member of the Australian Parliament for Sturt
- In office 18 May 2019 – 3 May 2025
- Preceded by: Christopher Pyne
- Succeeded by: Claire Clutterham

Personal details
- Born: 27 March 1983 (age 43) Adelaide, South Australia
- Party: Liberal
- Education: St Peter's College, Adelaide
- Alma mater: University of Adelaide
- Website: www.jamesstevens.com.au

James William Stevens (born 27 March 1983) is an Australian politician. He was the Liberal Party member of the Australian House of Representatives for the Division of Sturt in South Australia from 2019 to 2025. He was elected in the 2019 Australian federal election, replacing the retiring Liberal member, Christopher Pyne. He was defeated in Sturt at the 2025 federal election by Claire Clutterham of the Labor Party.

== Early life and education ==
James Stevens was born on 27 March 1983 in Rose Park, South Australia.

Stevens attended Canberra Grammar School before completing school at St Peters College, Adelaide. He gained a Bachelor of Commerce and Master of International Trade and Development at the University of Adelaide.

== Career before politics ==
Stevens worked for Michell Wool, including as Commercial Manager and General Manager.

== Political life ==
From July 2004 to July 2006, Stevens served as President of the South Australian Young Liberal Movement. In 2005 he ran for the position of Federal Young Liberal President but was defeated by Alex Hawke.

Stevens had worked for Christopher Pyne, and became chief of staff to Steven Marshall in February 2013 upon Marshall being elected the new Leader of the Opposition in state government. He had previously been campaign manager for Marshall's successful entry into state politics in the 2010 election, defeating Labor incumbent Vini Ciccarello in the seat of Norwood.

Stevens also served as the president of the Liberal Party in the Dunstan State Electorate Council from 2012 to 2016 and Sturt Federal Electorate Council from 2016 to 2019.

From 2013 to 2018, Stevens served as the chief of staff to the leader of the parliamentary Liberal Party of South Australia.

Stevens was appointed the chief of staff to the South Australian Premier Steven Marshall from 2018 to 2019. He oversaw the adoption by the party of data mining software in the lead-up to the 2018 South Australian state election.

Stevens was elected to the House of Representatives for the Division of Sturt in South Australia at the 2019 federal election, replacing Christopher Pyne, who announced in March 2019 that he would retire from politics.

Stevens is a member of the Moderate faction of the Liberal Party.

Stevens suffered a large swing of 7.4% against him at the 2022 federal election, but managed to retain the seat by a slim margin of 0.5%.

Stevens lost to Labor candidate Claire Clutterham at the 2025 federal election following another large swing in Sturt. He lost 8.8 percent of his primary vote from 2022, and lost to Clutterham on a swing of over seven percent after all preferences were distributed. Stevens was ultimately defeated on the sixth count after Green preferences flowed overwhelmingly to Clutterham. It would be the first time the Liberals lost Sturt since the 1969 federal election.

== Recognition ==
In June 2013, The Advertiser newspaper listed Stevens as one of the 50 Most Influential South Australians.

== Personal life ==
Stevens is dating Alex May, the current State Director of the Liberal Party in South Australia and former Deputy Chief of Staff to Premier Steven Marshall.

Parliament of Australia
Preceded by Christopher Pyne	Member for Sturt; 2019–2025	Succeeded by Claire Clutterham
