= Ian Wilson (Australian politician) =

Australian politician

The Honourable Ian Wilson
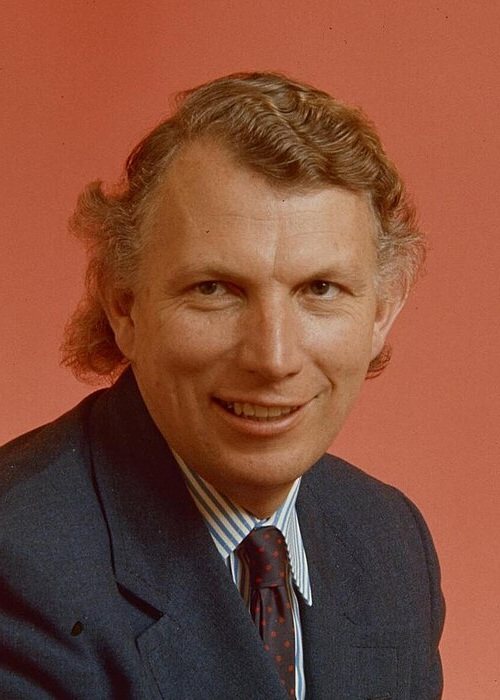
- Wilson in 1974

Minister for Aboriginal Affairs
- In office 7 May 1982 – 11 March 1983
- Prime Minister: Malcolm Fraser
- Preceded by: Peter Baume
- Succeeded by: Clyde Holding

Minister for Home Affairs and the Environment
- In office 19 March 1981 – 7 May 1982
- Prime Minister: Malcolm Fraser
- Preceded by: Michael MacKellar
- Succeeded by: Tom McVeigh

Member of the Australian Parliament for Sturt
- In office 2 December 1972 – 8 February 1993
- Preceded by: Norm Foster
- Succeeded by: Christopher Pyne
- In office 26 November 1966 – 25 October 1969
- Preceded by: Keith Wilson
- Succeeded by: Norm Foster

Personal details
- Born: 2 May 1932 Adelaide, South Australia
- Died: 2 April 2013 (aged 80) Adelaide, South Australia
- Party: Liberal
- Spouse: Mary Wilson
- Parent(s): Keith Wilson; Elizabeth Bonython
- Education: University of Adelaide
- Occupation: Solicitor

Ian Bonython Cameron Wilson AM (2 May 1932 – 2 April 2013) was an Australian politician. He was a member of the Liberal Party and represented the Division of Sturt in federal parliament (1966–1969, 1972–1993). He held ministerial office in the Fraser government from 1981 to 1983.

== Early life ==
Wilson was born in Adelaide, South Australia, the son of Sir Keith Wilson, a prominent United Australia Party and Liberal Party politician. His mother, Elizabeth, (Lady Betty Wilson CBE), was a granddaughter of Sir John Langdon Bonython, owner of The Advertiser and a member of the first federal House of Representatives, and a great-granddaughter of Sir John Cox Bray, South Australia's first native-born premier.

Wilson was educated at St Peter's College and the University of Adelaide, where he graduated in law, and at Magdalen College, Oxford (S.A. Rhodes Scholar 1955), where he did a higher law degree. He was a solicitor and company director before entering politics.

== Politics ==
In 1966, Wilson was elected to the House of Representatives for the Adelaide seat of Sturt, which his father had held with one break since 1949. It was considered a fairly safe Liberal seat, but at the 1969 election there was a strong swing to Labor in South Australia, and Wilson was unexpectedly defeated by Norm Foster. In the 1972 election, Wilson regained the seat even as Labor won government. He held it without difficulty for the next 20 years.

Wilson was relatively moderate on most issues, and joined the Liberal Movement in 1972 while it was an internal faction of the Liberal Party. He was a serious Anglican and active in many charitable and social welfare groups. This did not make him popular with the more conservative wing of the party. When the Liberals came to power under Malcolm Fraser in 1975, he was initially passed over for ministerial preferment in favour of the more conservative John McLeay Jr.

In 1981, McLeay was dropped from cabinet and Wilson was appointed Minister for Home Affairs and the Environment. In 1982 he was shifted to Aboriginal Affairs, a notoriously unpopular portfolio in Coalition governments. He held this position until the defeat of the Liberal government in 1983. He was not included in the Opposition Shadow Ministry after the elections, and remained as a backbencher. He lost Liberal pre-selection ahead of the 1993 election to Christopher Pyne, 35 years his junior, and retired after the election.

== Personal life ==
Wilson died from cancer in Adelaide on 2 April 2013, aged 80.

Political offices
Preceded by Michael MacKellar	Minister for Home Affairs and the Environment; 1981–1982	Succeeded by Tom McVeigh
Preceded by Fred Chaney	Minister for Aboriginal Affairs; 1982–1983	Succeeded by Clyde Holding
Parliament of Australia
Preceded by Keith Wilson	Member for Sturt; 1966–1969	Succeeded by Norm Foster
Preceded by Norm Foster	Member for Sturt; 1972–1993	Succeeded by Christopher Pyne
