= Black Sky Aerospace =

Australian aerospace company

- Type: Private
- Industry: Aerospace
- Founded: 21 November 2018
- Headquarters: Logan City, Queensland, Australia
- Key people: Blake Nikolic (Chief Executive Officer); Karl Hemphill (Chief Operating Officer); Tim Byrne (Engineering Lead)
- Services: Sub Orbital Launches; Propulsion; Telemetry and Avionics; Development and Testing; Consultation; Custom Services
- Website: bsaero.space

Black Sky Aerospace (BSA) is an Australian private aerospace company, headquartered in Logan, Queensland. Black Sky Aerospace specialises in payload delivery systems using in-house developed propulsion technologies, rocket componentry and suborbital vehicles. Black Sky also provides access to calibration and simulation systems.

== History ==
In 2021, Black Sky Aerospace welcomed the federal government's allocation of A$678,487 for the company to manufacture Responsive Common Use Booster (RCUB) propellant for commercial use. Black Sky CEO Blake Nikolic said the project received grant funding from the Australian Space Agency's Moon to Mars Supply Chain Capability Improvement grant opportunity. In June 2023, Goondiwindi Regional Council issued planning approval for Black Sky to develop its rocket launch site northwest of the town.

== Description ==
Black Sky Aerospace is an Australian private aerospace company, headquartered in Logan, Queensland. It was formerly located in Jimboomba.

== Milestones ==
=== Australia's first commercial rocket launch ===
On 21 November 2018, Black Sky Aerospace successfully conducted Australia's first commercial payload rocket launch from the nation's only sub-orbital launch facility west of Goondiwindi in Queensland. This sub-orbital mission utilised a Sighter190 research rocket to carry experimental payloads and instruments to an altitude of approximately 20,000 ft (6,100 m).

The then-Minister for State Development, Manufacturing, Infrastructure and Planning, Cameron Dick, was present to press the launch button.

=== Rocket motor manufacture ===
In September 2019, Black Sky Aerospace was granted approval by regulators to begin manufacturing solid rocket motors. Solid rocket motors (SRM's) are the fuel (propellant) that boosts rockets in to space, such as the boosters on the space shuttle and is the preferred fuel to use by many space launch companies due to its simplicity and cost-effectiveness. The company will be the first manufacturer of its kind in Australia and will be able to provide access to solid fuels for orbital and sub-orbital launch vehicles.

=== Priority access to Arnhem Space Centre ===
In October 2019, Black Sky Aerospace gained priority access to the new Equatorial Launch Australia (ELA) Arnhem Space Centre near Nhulunbuy in the Northern Territory. BSA director Blake Nikolic said priority access to the Arnhem Space Centre would provide his customers with the benefits of launching close to the equator.

Equatorial Launch Australia operates the Arnhem Space Centre and as of 2019, planned to host NASA's first launch from a foreign non-government-owned site. The launch, of an astrophysics-oriented sounding rocket, successfully occurred on the morning of 27 June 2022, with a second scheduled for 4 July, and a third later in the month.

=== Ute-launched artillery rocket ===
In 2022, Black Sky successfully launched an artillery rocket from a module mounted on the tray of a commercially available Holden Colorado.

== Products ==
- Sighter190 research rocket
- Holden Colorado-launched artillery rocket
