= Keith Wilson (South Australian politician) =

Australian lawyer and politician (1900–1987)

Sir Keith Wilson
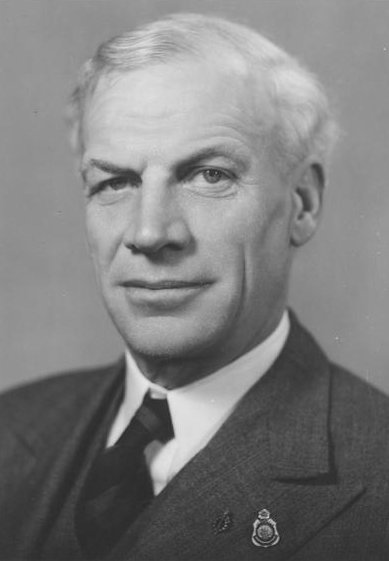
- Sir Keith Cameron Wilson, 1950

Member of the Australian Parliament for Sturt
- In office 10 December 1949 – 29 May 1954
- Preceded by: Seat created
- Succeeded by: Norman Makin
- In office 10 December 1955 – 31 October 1966
- Preceded by: Norman Makin
- Succeeded by: Ian Wilson

Senator for South Australia
- In office 1 July 1938 – 30 June 1944
- Preceded by: Jack Duncan-Hughes
- Succeeded by: Ted Mattner

Personal details
- Born: 3 September 1900 Adelaide, South Australia, Australia
- Died: 28 September 1987 (aged 87) Adelaide, South Australia, Australia
- Party: UAP (until 1945); Liberal (from 1945)
- Spouse: Elizabeth Bonython (m. 1930)
- Relations: John Lavington Bonython (father-in-law)
- Children: Ian Wilson

Sir Keith Cameron Wilson (3 September 1900 – 28 September 1987) was an Australian lawyer and politician. He was a Senator for South Australia from 1938 to 1944, representing the United Australia Party, and later returned to parliament as a Liberal Party member of the House of Representatives from 1949 to 1954 and 1955 to 1966. Despite his long service he never held ministerial office.

== Early life ==
Wilson was born on 3 September 1900 in Adelaide, a son of lawyer A. T. K. Wilson (died 15 August 1925) and his wife Lilian (née Laurence). He attended St Peter's College, Adelaide, and studied law at the University of Adelaide. His grandfather, C. A. Wilson, and great-grandfather, Thomas Wilson, were also lawyers who practised in South Australia.

In 1930 he married Elizabeth "Betty" Hornabrook Bonython (25 January 1907 – 25 September 2008), born in Adelaide, the eldest daughter of Advertiser editor, and lord mayor of Adelaide, Sir John Lavington Bonython (1875–1960) and his first wife Blanche Ada Bray (1881–1908). She would be very active in community affairs, serving on the boards of a number of organisations, in recognition of which she was appointed MBE in 1946, and CBE in 1959.

== Political career ==
In the 1934 Australian federal election he was, with J. L. Price, nominated by the Liberal and Country League for the seat of Boothby. Price was the winning candidate.

In the 1937 Australian federal election, Keith was elected a Senator for South Australia for the United Australia Party, serving from 1938 to 1944. In 1940 he joined the army, continuing to serve in the Senate. He was not re-elected in 1943, so when his term ended, he went on active service and became a "Rat of Tobruk", serving with the 2/7th Field Regiment, Royal Australian Artillery, in North Africa, and subsequently in Borneo.

After his return, he stood in the 1949 election for the Liberal Party of Australia (which had absorbed the UAP in 1944) as its candidate in the newly created seat of Sturt, and won. He held Sturt until his defeat by Labor's Norman Makin in 1954. A redistribution ahead of the 1955 election saw most of Sturt's Labor-friendly territory shifted to newly created Bonython, which made Sturt notionally Liberal. Makin opted to contest Bonython, and Wilson retook Sturt on a large swing. He held the seat until his retirement in 1966 which resulted in his son, Ian, gaining preselection for the seat, which he subsequently won and held for over 20 years.

Wilson was knighted on 1 January 1966. He died in Adelaide on 28 September 1987. He was the last surviving member of the 1937-1944 Senate.

== Publications ==
- "Liberal and Country League: the origins and development", by Sir Keith Wilson; Located at Barr Smith Library, University of Adelaide.

== Notes ==
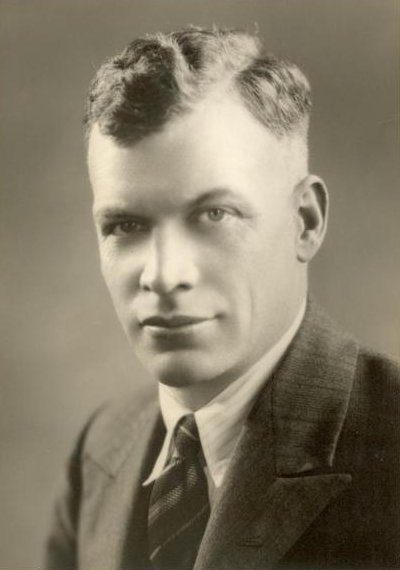
1938

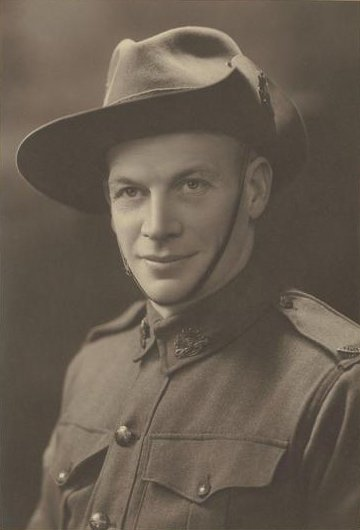
1941

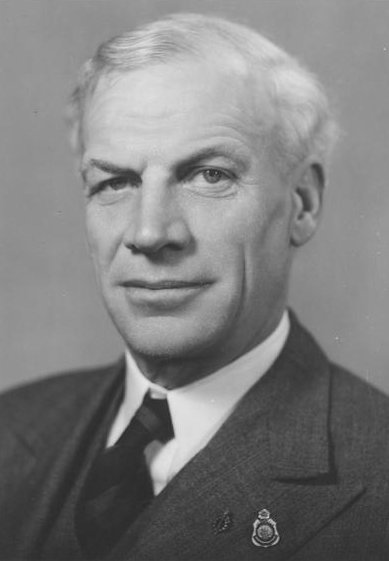
1950

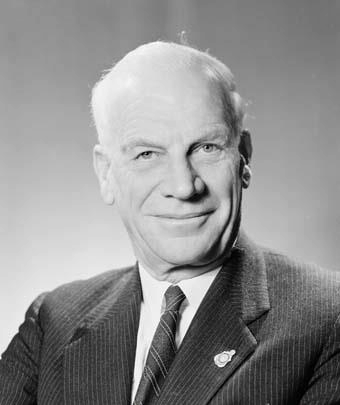
1960s

Parliament of Australia
New division	Member for Sturt; 1949–1954	Succeeded by Norman Makin
Preceded by Norman Makin	Member for Sturt; 1955–1966	Succeeded by Ian Wilson
Honorary titles
Preceded by Guy Arkins	Earliest serving living Senator; 1980 – 1987	Succeeded by Don Willesee
