= Claire Clutterham =

Australian politician

Claire Clutterham MP
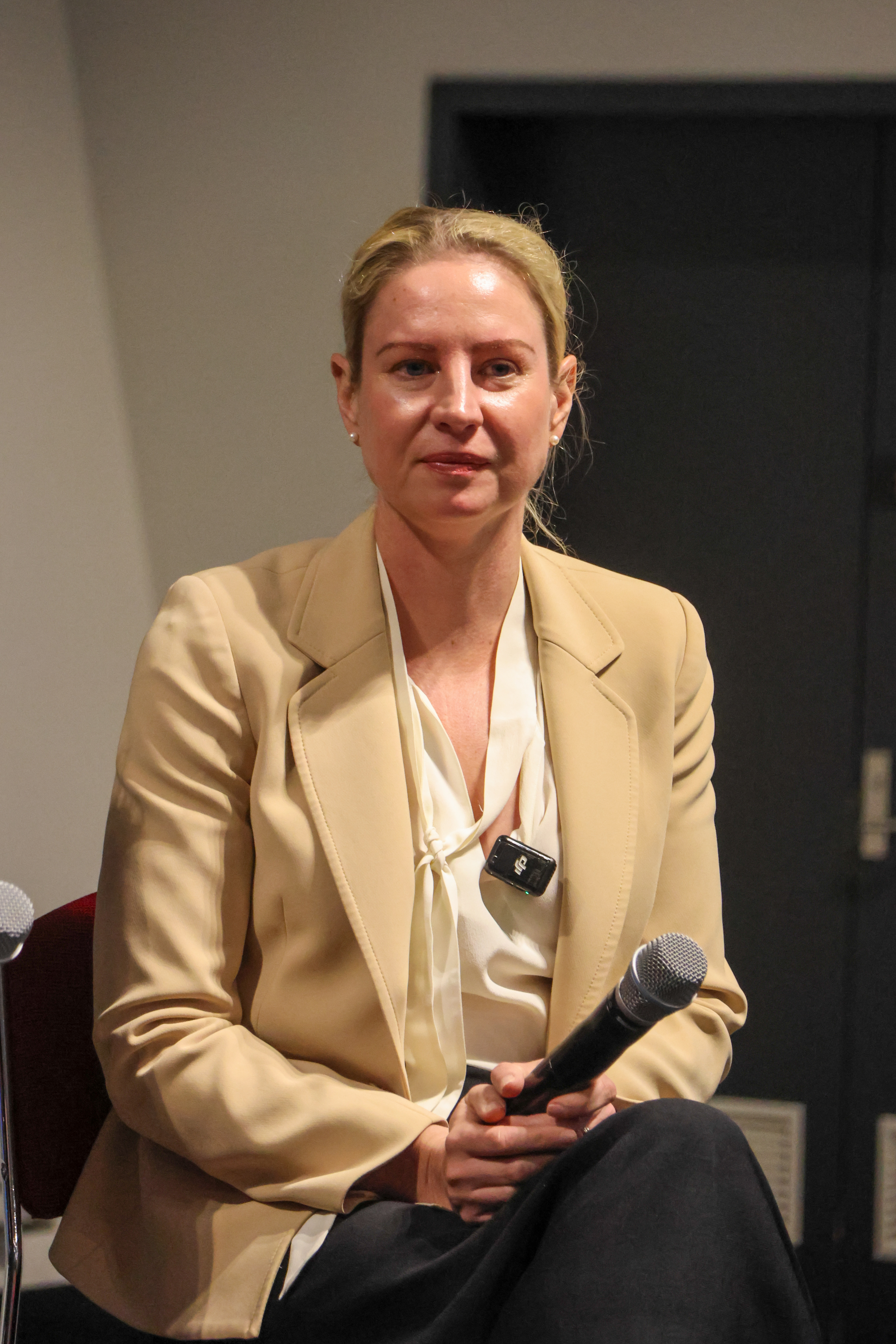
- Clutterham in 2026

Member of the Australian Parliament for Sturt
- Incumbent
- Assumed office 3 May 2025
- Preceded by: James Stevens

Personal details
- Born: 24 April 1982 (age 44) Adelaide, South Australia
- Party: Labor
- Education: University of Adelaide; University of London; University of New England
- Profession: Lawyer
- Website: www.claireclutterham.com.au

Claire Clutterham (born 24 April 1982) is an Australian politician. She is a member of the Australian Labor Party (ALP) and has served in the House of Representatives since 2025, representing the South Australian seat of Sturt. She was a lawyer before entering parliament.

== Early life ==
Clutterham was born in Adelaide on 24 April 1982. She grew up in the Riverland. In her maiden speech to parliament she recalled that her family had moved frequently during her childhood for his father's job as a bank manager, leading her to attend three primary schools and three high schools.

Clutterham holds the degrees of Bachelor of Arts and Bachelor of Laws from the University of Adelaide, Master of Laws from the University of London and Master of Teaching from the University of New England.

== Career ==
Clutterham was admitted as a lawyer in 2005. She worked overseas for international dispute resolution firm LK Law from 2008 to 2016, where she was based in Dubai and involved in international arbitration proceedings in Hong Kong and the Middle East. Her clients included a Saudi Arabian state enterprise involved in the construction of an oil pipeline, a Kuwaiti state enterprise working on a clean fuels project, an Australian coal mine operator, and a Korean contractor constructing a pipeline in Qatar.

Clutterham served as a councillor for the City of Norwood Payneham & St Peters from 2022 to 2025. She also lectured in law at the University of Adelaide and served on the board of the Royal Flying Doctor Service.

== Politics ==
In June 2024, Clutterham won ALP preselection for the Division of Sturt, receiving the personal endorsement of Prime Minister Anthony Albanese. She is aligned with the Labor Right faction.

Clutterham won Sturt for the ALP at the 2025 federal election, defeating the incumbent Liberal MP James Stevens. She was the first Labor MP for the seat since 1972. Her victory left the Liberals without any seats in Adelaide for the first time since 1946.

In her maiden speech, Clutterham supported the Albanese government's social media ban for children, citing her own experiences with severe childhood bullying.

Parliament of Australia
Preceded by James Stevens	Member for Sturt; 2025–present	Incumbent
