= List of youth councils =

This is a list of youth councils around the world.

== Youth councils ==
Name	Location	Country	Founded	Ages	Notes
Dartford Youth Council	Borough of Dartford	United Kingdom		12-18	Dartford Youth Council aims to give young people a voice on subjects that matter to the youth of Dartford. Members of DYC are from academic years 8 – 13. They discuss issues affecting the youth of Dartford as well as aiming toto improve Dartford from a youth perspective Works with the Kent Youth County Council and the British Youth Council.e.
Harrow Youth Parliament	London Borough of Harrow	United Kingdom	2009	11-18	Serves over 20,000 young people in Harrow. Has one seat on the Harrow Council Overview & Scrutiny Committee
Oldham Youth Council	Oldham	United Kingdom	2006	11-21	First Youth Council in the United Kingdom to hold constitutional power in the local government. First and only Youth Council in the United Kingdom to be awarded the Queen's Award for Voluntary Service - the MBE for volunteer groups.
Japanese Community Youth Council	San Francisco, California	United States	1970		Serves 8,000 children and families each year.
National Youth Council of Nigeria	Abuja	Nigeria	1954		The Authentic Mouthpiece and the umbrella body of all youth organisations in Nigeria. It is charged with policy formulation and implementation on issues bordering on youth development in Nigeria.
Maine Legislative Youth Advisory Council	U.S Virgin Islands Legislative Youth Advisory Council	United States		13 through adult	Has authority to introduce legislation
National Youth Assembly of Korea	Seoul	South Korea	2003		The main national youth parliament under supervisions by the National Assembly of Korea and with limited powers to make bills directly to full sessions and committees of the National Assembly.
National Youth Commission	Quezon City	Philippines		15-30	Lead policy agency on youth development in the Philippines. NYC is under the Office of the President of the Philippines. Currently, Richard Alvin Nalupta is the chairman and CEO of NYC Philippines. It has two commissioner at large and three commissioner per region (Luzon, Visayas, Mindanao). The President of Sangguniang Kabataan National Federation is also ex officio commissioner of NYC. Terms and qualification are based on RA 8044. They are also entitled as cabinet officials.
National Youth Council of Ireland	Nationwide	Ireland	1967		A national representative body for voluntary youth organisations.
Comhairle na nÓg	31 administrative counties	Republic of Ireland	2002	12 to 17 (must be in secondary education)	Local youth councils, run by the government. Each one has an input local decisions, and through its National Executive, national decision making.
National Youth Council of Singapore	Bishan–Toa Payoh	Singapore	1989	13 to 35	The national coordinating body for youth affairs in Singapore
Salford Youth Council	City of Salford	United Kingdom		11-21	Salford Youth Council is a group of 11-21 year olds who represent the voice of young people in Salford. As a group the young people work on campaigns which matter to young people, and are consulted on issues which effect young people, whilst creating positive stories of young people.
Sangguniang Kabataan	Philippines	Philippines	1991	15-17	Serves as local youth council in the country. It has a chairman and members of the council whom to be elected by registered voters in the barangay. Each chairman are entitled to become part as members of the Federation which will serve as member (ex officio) in the local legislative bodies except for the National Federation. It has indirect supervision by NYC Philippines. Formerly known as Kabataang Barangay (KB)
Youth Parliament of Malaysia	Kuala Lumpur	Malaysia	2015	18-30	
Youth Parliament Program	Jaipur	India	2016		The Youth Parliament Program would be a debate between the best debaters and policymakers and opinion-makers. The platform will inspire the youth to express their views in an organized way. It will also allow for the emergence of bright future leaders To Create Awareness and Empower Youth though Youth parliament sessions
Wellington City Youth Council	Wellington, New Zealand	New Zealand	1998	15-24	Provides feedback/submission to proposed council policies.

== See also ==
- Youth voice
- Youth politics
