= PAL-TIN =

The PAL-TIN (Participarea TINerilor la Administrarea Locala, translated as Youth Participation in Local Government) Project is a large network of local youth and children’s councils throughout Romania. PAL-TIN (acronym commonly shortened to PALTIN) was an initiative of the Bucharest-based MASTER Forum Association (started in 1994) to develop local youth councils in Romania along the lines of the youth council charter adopted by the European Union. By 2007 the program included over 90 youth and child councils throughout Romania.

== History ==
Following the popular uprising and overthrow of the country's communist dictatorship in 1989, a number of civic organizations were developed that focused on the promotion of democracy and the popular spread and implementation of democratic ideals. A number of these organizations banded together in the creation of an association called MASTER Forum focused on supporting the trends of building a civil society, initiatives of youth and youth associations. The founders consisted of European Union/Phare for Democracy Program, Solon Foundation from Switzerland, Fund for the Development of the Carpathian Euroregion, and the Civil Society Development Foundation. Out of this forum came the PAL-TIN (Youth Participation in Local Government) Project, the primary objective of which is the promotion of youth participation in public decisions about matters that concern them.

The initiative is developed along the lines of the EU youth council charter. Resolution 237 from 1992 of the Permanent Conference of Local and Regional Authorities in Europe adopted the Charter on the Participation of Young People in Local and Regional Life in which it is affirmed that: "municipalities and other territorial communities will create adequate institutional conditions for the participation of the young people in decision-making and debates on problems of interest to them... will create and support youth councils that function as a structure of active participation...".

== Council Framework ==
The youth council framework was designed to serve as:

- A place where teenagers can express and dialogue among themselves and with local administration, decision-making factors on problems of interest to them;
- A frame of activity conceived and accomplished by young people, at the level of their day by day existence, having the local community as central reference space;
- And a place for practical learning of democratic citizenship, of expression, communication, dialogue, negotiation, decision-making and evaluation.

The PAL-TIN Project is able to support the individual youth councils through:

- Offering the existing documentation, translated or adapted;
- Putting the evaluation studies regarding the functioning of the councils at the disposal of groups interested in the creation of youth councils so that difficulties can be avoided;
- Providing consultant services to local administrations interested in getting involved in the creation of such councils;
- Organizing training of volunteers willing to get involved in the creation of the councils;
- Participating, along with the local coordinators, in the design and support of the activity of the local councils, providing assistance during the implementation of local projects;
- Organizing experience-sharing meetings, seminars and workshops for the initiators of such councils;
- Elaborating presentation materials, recommendations and documentation for the organization of elections for youth local councils.
