= Youth Parliament (Greece) =

Greek Youth Political Organisation

Youth Parliament Βουλή των Εφήβων
- Formation: 1994 (32 years ago)
- Location: Athens, Greece
- Region served: Greece
- Members: 300 (per year)
- Official language: Greek
- Main organ: The General Assembly (Greek: Η Ολομέλεια)
- Parent organization: Hellenic Parliament
- Website: www.efivoi.gr

Parliament composition in 2010: Greece (300)

The Youth Parliament (Greek: Βουλή των Εφήβων, Voulí ton Efívon, literally "Parliament of the Youth") is a Youth Parliament organization established in 1994 and hosted annually by the Hellenic Parliament. 300 Lyceum Students from around the country are elected to represent their electorate districts by serving for one year as Young Members of the Parliament.

The aim of the institution is the active participation of young Greeks in the political life of the country and the encouragement to become active and responsible citizens.

== Structure ==
The parliament's main organ in the plenary, which is made up of all delegates. Students also form 5 parliamentary committees each one addressing different issues related to school life and young adult life such as the Democratic Procedures Committee, the Education Committee and the Art and Science Committee.

At the end of the Session each Committee chooses a Representative for representation in the General Assembly of the Youth Parliament which many Politicians attend.

In the 2019 and 2020 session, only domestic communities received representation in the parliament sessions.

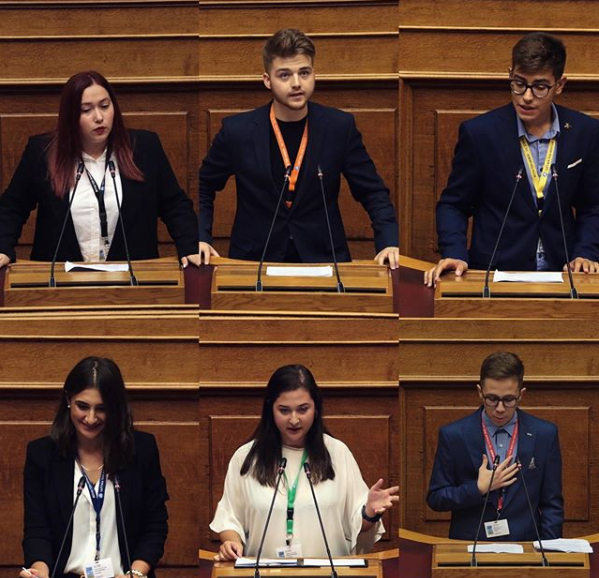
The six committee representatives to the 24th session of the Parliament in 2019, including Petros Apostolakis (2nd from upper left), Mpaka Ioanna (1st) and four other members of the delegation.

== See also ==
- European Youth Parliament
- Hellenic Parliament
- Model United Nations
