= Maine Legislative Youth Advisory Council =

The Maine Legislative Youth Advisory Council (LYAC) (established 2002) advises the Legislature, legislative leadership and legislative committees on issues related to youth.

== Function ==
Its statutory role as an ongoing "advisory council" to the Maine Legislature is codified in Maine Revised Statutes,Title 3, section 168-A. LYAC was the first youth council in the nation to have both an advisory relationship with legislators and the statutory authority to submit legislation.

The LYAC has 16 youth members and four legislative members. The council is authorized to meet up to six times each year, including at least two public hearings, and it may conduct periodic seminars on leadership, government and the Legislature. The council is required to report biannually to the Legislature and may submit legislation to implement its recommendations.
