= European Youth Parliament – Ukraine =

European Youth Parliament Ukraine
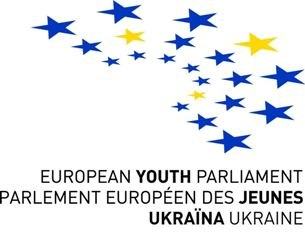
- Founded: 2000
- Founder: Olga Smyrnova, Vasyl Myroshnychenko
- Type: Educational Charity
- Location: Ukraine
- Region served: Ukraine
- Revenue: non-profit organisation

European Youth Parliament Ukraine (EYP Ukraine) – is a politically unbound non-profit organisation, which encourages Ukrainian youth to actively engage in citizenship and cultural understanding. It is not connected to any religion. The EYP Ukraine represents one of the 40 National Committees of EYP. It was found in Ukraine in 2000.

== History of EYP ==
The European Youth Parliament was founded by Laurent Grégoire (FR) and Bettina Carr-Allinson (NL), initially as a school project at the Lycée François-Ier in Fontainebleau, to the south of Paris. It is there that three of the first four International Sessions were held, starting in 1988, about a year after the idea took place.

It then developed steadily for a few years until it moved to Witney, Oxfordshire, in 1991, and was legally recognised as the European Youth Parliament International Ltd., a subsidiary of a charity created in 1992 for this purpose, the Fontainebleau Youth Foundation. The organisation experienced an enduring growth for the next ten years, its network counting an increasing number of National Committees and its activities becoming both larger and more numerous. The National Committees stretch beyond the scope of countries within the European Union and try to encompass all European countries.

In the years 2001 to 2004, the EYP encountered various problems of financial nature. On November 4, 2004, however, the European Youth Parliament was reborn due to a mutual agreement between representatives of EYP's Board of National Committees, alumni and the Heinz-Schwarzkopf Foundation. The EYP's status since then has been a programme of the Schwarzkopf-Stiftung Junges Europa, and is hosted in Berlin, Germany.

The actual activities of the EYP never faltered during this period.

Since 2004, the EYP has introduced several reforms to introduce more transparency in its institutions and further enlarged its activities.

== History of EYP Ukraine ==
EYP-Ukraine has successfully operated in Ukraine since 2000. It encourages youths to take part in one of the largest platforms for debates, intercultural meetings, educational work and exchange of ideas among young Europeans.

As an organization the “European Youth Parliament Ukraine” (EYP-Ukraine) was registered with the Ministry of Justice of Ukraine on February 18, 2002 and became a full-fledged participant in the development of civil society.

== Structure ==
At the international level, the EYP is governed by an international board, the Governing Body. The Governing Body has six members elected by the National Committees and by the alumni of past sessions. A representative of the Heinz-Schwarzkopf Foundation is also a member. The board is largely responsible for the quality assurance of the International Sessions but also takes responsibility for the overall direction of the organisation and the long-term sustainability and protection of the organisation. The day-to-day business of the organisation is administered by a hired manager at the International Office in Berlin. Philipp J. Scharff was the manager from 2004 until 2008, Jan Phillip Beck (DE) from 2008 until 2011, Ville Vasaramäki (FI) from 2011 until 2013 and Krista Lagus (FI) from 2013 until 2017. Lukas Fendel (DE) has been taken on the role of Executive Director from 2017 until 2020.

At the national level, the National Committees are free to choose how to manage themselves, though the form of management must comply with basic democratic principles. It is the responsibility of the National Committees to organise and fund their own national sessions (more about them below). International Sessions can receive limited funding from EYP at the international level but are largely responsible for their economy as well. Sessions are usually funded through sponsorship from various organisations or corporations. Each session must be economically independent.

== Presidents ==
Year	Full name
2000-2002	Olga Smyrnova (cofounder)
2002-2004	Vasyl Myroshnychenko (cofounder)
2004-2005	Tetiana Poladko
2005-2010	Oleksandra Andrusyk
2010-2011	Kateryna Vynogradova
2011-2013	Anna Suprunenko
2014	Yegor Vlasenko
2015	Kristina Chelmakina
2016	Sherbaz Ahmed [6 Months]
2016	Nataliia Senatorova [Interim]
2017	Michael Rozhkov
2017-2018	Valeria Nikitenko
2018-2019	Tetiana Lavrichenko
2019-2020	Lesia Pogorila
2020-2022	Vitaly Koshitsky
2023	Mariia Panchenko

== Format ==
Official EYP sessions take place in the form of an extended, interactive simulation of the deliberation of the European Parliament. Sessions are a few day lasting events that simulate the activities of the European Parliament. The program of many sessions also includes additional elements, such as Euroconcert, evenings dedicated to the national cuisine of each country (Eurovillage), as well as workshops, events and excursions. Sessions gather together hundreds of young people approximately between ages of 15 and 22.
