= European Youth Parliament - Ireland =

Irish political nonprofit organization

European Youth Parliament Ireland
- Founded: 1997
- Type: Not-for-profit business
- Location: Republic of Ireland
- Region served: Republic of Ireland
- Key people: Michael D. Higgins (patron)
- Revenue: non-profit organisation
- Website: EYP Ireland

European Youth Parliament Ireland (Gaeilge: Parlaimint na hEorpa Óige na hÉireann) is a politically unaffiliated, nonprofit organization that encourages Irish youth to be actively engaged in political discourse. It is part of the international European Youth Parliament network and operates across the Republic of Ireland, with Northern Ireland being under the responsibility of EYP UK. EYP Ireland represents one of the 40 National Committees of EYP International.

== History ==
The European Youth Parliament was founded by Bettina Carr-Allinson as a school project at the Lycée François-Ier in Fontainebleau. From 2001 to 2004 the EYP encountered various financial problems and did not meet. However, on November 4, 2004, it was reborn due an agreement between the EYP's Board of National Committees, EYP alumni and the Heinz-Schwarzkopf Foundation. The politically impartial Heinz-Schwarzkopf Foundation Young Europe was founded in 1971 in Hamburg. The foundation's name was changed to the Schwarzkopf Foundation Young Europe. Since then the EYP has been overseen and supported by the Schwarzkopf-Stiftung Junges Europa and is hosted in Berlin, Germany.

In Ireland, the first national session was held in 1997. Due to the organizational structure, it was only open to students in County Dublin. It was opened up to non-Dublin students in 2000. Since then, it has gradually increased in participation. Four regional sessions are hosted every year.

== Sessions ==
=== Regional Sessions ===
Four regional sessions are operated across the nation throughout the year. The Munster Session takes place with participants from the province of Munster; the Leinster Session takes place with participants from the province of Leinster (excluding County Dublin); the Dublin Session takes place with participants from the counties of Fingal, South Dublin, Dún Laoghaire–Rathdown, and the city of Dublin; and the Connacht-Ulster Session takes place with participants from the province of Connacht and the three counties of Donegal, Cavan, and Monaghan. The six counties in Northern Ireland have their own regional session under the auspices of EYP United Kingdom.

Each regional session is held in varying location across the province. Locations may differ from year to year. For instance, the Connaught-Ulster Regional Session took place in Cavan in 2018, and Galway in 2019.

Each of these sessions take place over the course of ‘a full weekend’ (Friday evening, all-day Saturday, and all-day Sunday). The first day is dedicated to team building, in which participants get acquainted with those in their committee. The second day is where the majority of the work occurs, and a resolution is agreed upon. During the third day, the General Assembly takes place, where different committees debate and vote upon their resolutions.

=== National Sessions ===
A number of students selected from each regional session then participate in the national session. Each national session takes place in a different location around the country. The national session operates similarly to the regional sessions, but over the course of four days; two days are dedicated to creating the resolution instead of one. Students are then selected from the National Selection Conference to take part in an international session, which take place three times a year at varying locations throughout Europe and are organised by the EYP International Office.

=== National Session Locations ===
National Session	Host city 1	Host city 2	Theme	Project Manager
1999	Dublin City	-		
2006	Dublin City	-		
2007	Dublin City	-		
2010	Dublin City	-		
2011	Dublin City	-		
2012	Dublin City	-		
2013	Dublin City	-	'2039 - Building the Europe of Tomorrow'	
2014	Portlaoise, Laois	-	‘21st Century Europe: Forging Global Friendships’	
2015	Dublin City	-	'Tomorrow's Europe, Today'	Kieran McNulty
2016	Cork City	-	‘Remembering Our Country’s Past, Imagining Europe’s Future’	Brendan Byrne
2017	CIT, Cork City	-	‘Informed Europe; Growth through Understanding'	Oisín O'Rourke
2018	Mahon, Cork	-	‘Exploring Young European Potential’	Conor Dunne
2019	Galway City	-	'Safeguarding Sustainability: Participation as a Mechanism for Change'	Grace Preston and Leanne Brosnan
2020	Cavan (cancelled due to the COVID-19 pandemic)	-	'Stronger Together: A Brighter Future'	Luke and Ben Cunningham
2021	Cork City	-	'A Time of Transition: An Opportunity to Challenge Inequalities'	Emma Bradfield
2022	Cork City	-	'Only the beginning...'	Aidan Mamo and Dara Golden
2023	Cork City	-	'Accessibility'	Katie Kiely and Gabriele Rimkute
2024	Cork City	Dublin City	'Pushing the Boat Out - Promoting an Ambitious Europe'	James Barry and Brian Donnelly
2025	Cork City	-	'Igniting Change: Harnessing the Present to transform the future'	Róisín Ní Chadhla and Henry O' Riordan
2026	Cork City (Cancelled)	-	'Connecting Voices and Amplifying Change'	Feidhlim Moran
2027	Cork City	-	'Looking Back, Leading Forward'	Seán Mc Sweeney and Derry Flanagan

== Format ==
=== Committees ===
Participants are divided into committees, which are each given a topic of discussion. The committees are based on European Parliament committees. There may be two groups of the same committee; both have different topics, and are differentiated by number (e.g. AFET 1 and AFET 2).

First the committee creates a list of problems regarding their topic, followed by a list of possible solutions to the problems. When creating solutions, committees are not allowed to violate the powers of the European Union. For instance, committees cannot declare money must be spent on fixing a problem, only recommend it. Not all committees are present at every session. It is at the whims of the organizers, who usually select topics to go with the theme of the event.

Each committee is given a topic to base their resolution on. Rather than being given a broad topic, each committee is instead given a statement. For instance, a topic for the Committee on Foreign Affairs may be ”How can the programmes and institutions run by the North/South Ministerial Council between Ireland and Northern Ireland and underpinned by EU law be best protected from the financial, political and practical fallout of Brexit?”

Due to many of the topics being uncommon, explanatory guides are given to participants prior to the beginning of the session, to give enough time for individual research.

==== List of Committees ====
Abbreviation	Committee name
AFET	Committee on Foreign Affairs
AFCO	Committee on Constitutional Affairs
BCAA	Committee on Progress
SEDE	Committee on Security and Defense
ENVI	Committee on Environment, Public Health, and Food Safety
ITRE	Committee on Industry, Trade, and Research
JURI	Committee on Legal Affairs
LIBE	Committee on Civil Liberties, Justice, and Home Affairs
ECON	Committee on Economic and Monetary Affairs
AGRI	Committee on Agriculture and Rural Development
EMPL	Committee on Employment and Social Affairs
FEMM	Committee on Women's Rights and Gender Equality
DROI	Committee on Human Rights
CULT	Committee on Culture and Education
PECH	Committee on Fishing
INTA	Committee on International Trade
IMCO	Committee on Internal Markets and Consumer Protection
EMPL	Committee on Employment and Social Affairs
DEVE	Committee on Development
CLIM	Committee on Climate Change
TRAN	Committee on Transportation and Tourism

==== Event Structure ====
The first day is usually dedicated to ice breakers in order to familiarize committee members with each other. Several games are done with the purpose of getting participants acquainted with speaking up and compromise. One is played with the intent of getting people to compromise on a situation in which everyone will have differing moral viewpoints.

On the second day, the session will be formally declared at the opening ceremony. The European Anthem is played. A guest speaker addresses the speakers - previous guest speakers have included an tUachtarán Michael D Higgins. Each committee will then discuss their topic, and create a resolution. During the national session, this takes place over two days. During the evenings of the second (and third) day, social events are held, such as a disco, table quiz, or speaking events.

The final day plays host to the General Assembly (commonly referred to as 'The G.A.'), in which each committee in turn presents their completed resolution. Other committees then have the opportunity to debate the resolution, offering points of support, (or usually) criticism toward the resolution. When all three rounds of debate have finished, all students then have the opportunity to vote on the proposed resolution.

==== Structure of the General Assembly ====
- Brainstorming Time (2 min.) - Delegates are given 2 minutes to read over the proposed resolution before each debate starts, to plan.
- Defense Speech (3 min.) - One member of the committee will have the chance to go to the podium and deliver the defense speech on the resolution, laying out the basic underlying concepts of the proposing committee's resolution.
- Position Speech (2 x 1.5 min.) - Following the Defense speech, a delegate from another committee has the chance to give a position speech on the Motion for a Resolution of the proposing committee. A position speech is aimed at the central ideas of the resolution.
- Response to the Position Speech (1 min.) - After the position speech has been delivered, a member of the proposing committee receives the chance to answer the concerns raised. The response to the position speech is given from the floor.
- Open Debate - Any committee with a point or a question on the resolution can raise their committee placard and, when recognised by the board, can pose it to the proposing committee. The board will take approximately 3 points from the floor before allowing the proposing committee to respond to all of them. There will be 3 rounds of open debate per committee. (9 individual points) During each debate, committees must raise the placard with their committee name to show that they want to speak and wait for the board to officially give them the right to speak. For each resolution, a committee has the possibility to utilise one Direct Response.
- Summation Speech (2 x 1.5 min.) - Two members of the proposing committee can go to the podium to defend their resolution one last time. This occurs after the last round of Open Debate was responded to from the floor. The Summation Speech will be hold from the podium and it is the final chance to use all rhetorical energy and skill to convince people to vote in favour of the resolution.
- Voting - Finally, the General Assembly will proceed to vote on the resolution by the proposing committee. All students can vote in favor, against, or abstain. When all votes are counted (which may take a while), the results are announced.

== Organizational structure ==
The National Committee members of EYP Ireland are elected every Spring at the AGM. Positions include President, Vice-President, Treasurer, Conference Head Organiser Coordinator (CHOC), International Officer, Human Resources Officer, Fundraising and Outreach Officer, Graphic & Web Design Officer and Events Officer.

== International Sessions ==
=== History ===
Ireland has hosted international sessions in 1995, 2003, 2007, and 2016. Ireland hosted one of three international sessions in 2003. It was opened by President Mary McAleese. The session took place in Dublin Castle. In 2016, Ireland hosted the international session along with Belfast, in Northern Ireland. It was the first such International Session hosted between two nations, and was designed to highlight the lasting peace between North and South.

=== International Session Locations ===
Year	Host city	Host city (2)
1995	Dublin City	-
2003	Dublin City	-
2007	Dublin City	-
2016	Dublin City	Belfast City, UK
