= Youth Parliament of Malaysia =

Youth organisation

Youth Parliament of Malaysia Parlimen Belia Malaysia
- 4th Parliament

Type
- Type: Unicameral

History
- Founded: 10 January 2015; 11 years ago

Structure
- Seats: 78 Members of Youth Parliament (MYPs)
- Committees: Socioeconomics; International and Diplomatic Relations; Security, Law and Integrity; Education and Careers; Culture, Sports, Patriotism and Integration; Infrastructure, Development and Environment; Community Development and Health; Technology and Innovation; Human Capital

Elections
- Voting system: Online voting, plurality-at-large voting
- Last election: 13-20 July 2023

Meeting place
- Malaysian Houses of Parliament, Kuala Lumpur, Malaysia

Website
- parlimenbelia.kbs.gov.my

The Youth Parliament of Malaysia (Malay: Parlimen Belia Malaysia) is a youth council and simulation of the parliamentary proceedings of the Parliament of Malaysia for youth aged between 16 and 30. The Youth Parliament gives young people an insight into the workings of the Parliament of Malaysia and raise their awareness of the working of government. Three sessions are held each year (three days for each session), each involving 133 elected members.

In the 2014 election, 8,632 from 171,094 youth registered voters aged between 15 and 40 across the Malaysian states have done voting in the two-weeks polling day. The nationwide low turnout is just 5.05%. Only 171,094 (1.4%) from about 12 million Malaysian youths registered their name in the official website of the Youth Parliament. It shows the youth participation in the inaugural election was disappointing.

Other related programme involving Malaysian youth is Perdana Fellows Programme (since 2015).

== Timeline ==
- First Youth Parliament of Malaysia
  - Postponed several times from 2013 due to poor management and planning
  - Voter Registration : 1 July – ~~31 August~~ 16 September 2014
  - Nomination : 8–24 September 2014
  - Election : 22–31 October 2014
  - 2015 sitting
    - First session : 10–11 January 2015
    - Second session : 11–13 May 2015
    - Third session : 21–22 September 2015
  - 2016 sitting
    - First session : 17–18 February 2016
    - Second session : 9–10 August 2016
- Second Youth Parliament of Malaysia
  - Voter Registration : 1 March – 20 September 2016
  - Nomination : 13 July – 13 August 2016
- Third Youth Parliament of Malaysia
  - Voter Registration : Several times between April until 2 July 2019
  - Nomination : Several times between May until 4 July 2019
  - Election : 16-26 August 2019
  - Result : 28 August 2019
    - First session : 25-26 September 2019
- Fourth Youth Parliament of Malaysia
  - Voter Registration : Several times between April until 2 June 2023
  - Nomination : Several times between May until 2 June 2023
  - Election : 13-20 July 2023
  - Result : 24 July 2023
    - First session : August 2023

== Format ==
The format of the unicameral Youth Parliament of Malaysia resembles that of the actual Dewan Rakyat, the lower house of Parliament of Malaysia, All the 78 members undergo the orientation session for four days, and also briefed at a pre-sitting session. The delegations are then spread out in different committees, each committee with a particular topic. This ensures a maximized cultural diversity in the committee and serves as a strong incentive to socialize and make friends with people from the committee. The committees debates a certain topic extensively and drafts a resolution, a non-binding piece of legislation outlining the key issues of the topic and proposing solutions. The drafting process is followed by lobbying, during which delegates may debate and propose amendments for other resolutions. The session ends with a General Assembly, resolutions and amendments are debated and voted upon by all of the delegates. During voting, the resolutions received would be given rankings and preferences. Any successful resolutions are then forwarded to the Attorney-General's Chambers, Cabinet of Malaysia and Parliament of Malaysia. Question time also included involving the Ministers and Deputy Ministers related with the question to give oral answers in the Youth Parliament.

However, unlike the Dewan Rakyat sitting, there will be no government and opposition sides, but the members will sit according to their respective committee. There were nine committees altogether namely, the Socio-Economics; International and Diplomatic Relations; Security, Law and Integrity; Education and Careers; as well as Culture, Sports, Patriotism and Integration. Other than that, Infrastructure, Development and Environment; Community Development and Health; Technology and Innovation; as well as Human Capital.

As a model Parliament for young people, the Youth Parliament of Malaysia is patterned after the Dewan Rakyat although its membership is smaller than that of the Dewan Rakyat. Wherever possible, the Youth Parliament of Malaysia follows the rules of procedures and conduct of business as close to the Dewan Rakyat as practical. However, practices from other Parliaments are also adopted to expose Malaysian Youth to comparative parliamentary practices. Standing Order of Youth Parliament of Malaysia are provided to new members at the time of Orientation after their selection.

== Election procedure ==
Any Malaysian citizen aged between 16 and 30 is eligible to register as the voters in the official website of the Youth Parliament. The quick and simple online registration requires the person to give valid personal information. Any registered voters aged between 16 and 30 may qualify to become nominator and candidate. The qualification criteria can be referred in the official website. The nomination open for two weeks. The successful shortlisted candidates may use social media to campaign; the campaign is open for two weeks. After the campaign week ended, the registered voters have a right to vote online as many as quota available for their respective states through the official website. There are limit quota member allocated for every state according to the youth populations, using the scales: 1 member to 100,000 youth population. As a comparison, the youth voters from Perlis allowed to choose 1 candidate to represent Perlis to the Youth Parliament while the youth voters from Selangor can choose 17 candidates to represent Selangor to the Youth Parliament. The polling open for two weeks and the result would be announced two days after the closing day of polling. The election uses the plurality-at-large voting, a non-proportional voting system for electing several representatives simultaneously from a single state.

== Composition ==
In the Youth Parliament sessions, every members shall be referred according to their representing states together with their unique number.

The total membership of Youth Parliament is 78. The breakdown of membership is as follows:

State / federal territory	Youth populations (2010)	Seats (quota)	Seat name
Perlis	100,800	1	Perlis 01
Kedah	791,100	6	Kedah 01, Kedah 02, Kedah 03, Kedah 04, Kedah 05, Kedah 06
Kelantan	654,300	6	Kelantan 01, Kelantan 02, Kelantan 03, Kelantan 04, Kelantan 05, Kelantan 06
Terengganu	460,300	3	Terengganu 01, Terengganu 02, Terengganu 03
Penang	644,200	4	Pulau Pinang 01, Pulau Pinang 02, Pulau Pinang 03, Pulau Pinang 04
Perak	936,100	7	Perak 01, Perak 02, Perak 03, Perak 04, Perak 05, Perak 06, Perak 07
Pahang	636,100	5	Pahang 01, Pahang 02, Pahang 03, Pahang 04, Pahang 05
Selangor	2,472,400	17	Selangor 01, Selangor 02, Selangor 03, Selangor 04, Selangor 05, Selangor 06, Selangor 07, Selangor 08, Selangor 09, Selangor 10, Selangor 11, Selangor 12, Selangor 13, Selangor 14, Selangor 15, Selangor 16, Selangor 17
F. T. Kuala Lumpur & F. T. Putrajaya	771,200	5	WP. Kuala Lumpur 01, WP. Kuala Lumpur 02, WP. Kuala Lumpur 03, WP. Kuala Lumpur 04, and WP. Putrajaya 01
Negeri Sembilan	420,300	3	Negeri Sembilan 01, Negeri Sembilan 02, Negeri Sembilan 03
Malacca	350,100	2	Melaka 01, Melaka 02
Johor	1,372,500	10	Johor 01, Johor 02, Johor 03, Johor 04, Johor 05, Johor 06, Johor 07, Johor 08, Johor 09, Johor 10
Labuan	40,100	1	WP. Labuan 01
Sabah	1,142,000	10	Sabah 01, Sabah 02, Sabah 03, Sabah 04, Sabah 05, Sabah 06, Sabah 07, Sabah 08, Sabah 09, Sabah 10
Sarawak	1,018,300	8	Sarawak 01, Sarawak 02, Sarawak 03, Sarawak 04, Sarawak 05, Sarawak 06, Sarawak 07, Sarawak 08
Malaysia	11,809,800	78	

== See also ==
- Model parliament
- European Youth Parliament
- United Kingdom Youth Parliament
- Ministry of Youth and Sports (Malaysia)
