= Ministry of Youth and Sports (Malaysia) =

Government ministry of Malaysia

- Kementerian Belia dan Sukan (KBS) كمنترين بليا دان سوكن
- Coat of arms of Malaysia

- KBS Logo

Ministry overview
- Formed: 1987; 39 years ago
- Preceding Ministry: Ministry of Culture, Youth and Sports
- Jurisdiction: Government of Malaysia
- Headquarters: No. 27, Menara KBS, Persiaran Perdana, Precinct 4, Federal Government Administrative Centre, 62570 Putrajaya
- Employees: 14,590 (2022)
- Annual budget: MYR 1,182,924,500 (2026)
- Minister responsible: Mohammed Taufiq Johari, Minister of Youth and Sports
- Deputy Minister responsible: Mordi Bimol, Deputy Minister of Youth and Sports
- Ministry executives: Datuk Rahimi bin Ismail, Secretary-General; Abdullah bin Hasan, Deputy Secretary-General (Management); Chan Hong Jin, Deputy Secretary-General (Strategic)
- Website: www.kbs.gov.my

Footnotes
- Ministry of Youth and Sports on Facebook

The Malaysian Ministry of Youth and Sports (Malay: Kementerian Belia dan Sukan; Jawi: كمنترين بليا دان سوكن), abbreviated KBS, is a ministry of the Government of Malaysia that is responsible for youth, sports, recreation, leisure activities, stadiums, youth development, and youth organisations in the country.

== History ==
The early formation of the Ministry of Youth and Sports begun in 1953 with the incorporation of the Culture Division under the Department of Public Welfare. At that time, The Culture Division was given the role and responsibility of handling all matters relating to the youth affairs in Malaysia.

Later in 1964, the Culture Division was placed under the Ministry of Information. At the same time, as a consequence of the growth of organisational activities among youths, a Youth Division was formed to inculcate and supervise these activities under the ministry. Besides that, a Sports Division was also formed under the Ministry of Information.

The Ministry of Youth and Sports was only formed on 15 May 1964 in conjunction with the National Youth Day celebration of that year. In 1972, the Culture Division was established, and this has led the Ministry of Youth and Sports to change its name to the Ministry of Culture, Youth and Sports until 1987, as the Culture Division was eventually relocated under the Ministry of Culture, Arts and Tourism. Since then, the Ministry of Culture, Youth and Sports was reverted to its original name which, today, known as the Ministry of Youth and Sports.

Ministry of Youth and Sports (MYS) was given the mandate to implement the policies of the Malaysian government, particularly in the areas of Youth and Sports development.

On 5 April 2018, the current Malaysian government recognised the Malaysian Deaf Sports Association as the sole national federation to deal with the deaf sports after passing the amendment of National Sports Development Act which got approved in the parliament. The Ministry of Youth and Sports, Khairy Jamaluddin presented the amendment of the National Sports Development Act to the parliament which was approved on 3 April 2018.

== Organisation ==
- Minister of Youth and Sports
  - Deputy Minister of Youth and Sports
    - Secretary-General
      - Under the Authority of Secretary-General
        - National Department of Youth and Sports
          - Rakan Muda Development Division
          - Youth Development Division
          - Sports Development Division
          - State Departments of Youth and Sports
        - Sports Commissioner Office
        - Legal Advisor Office
        - Internal Audit Unit
        - Registrar of Youth Office
        - Corporate Communication Unit
        - Integrity Unit
        - SEA Games Secretariat
        - 2050 National Transformation Secretariat
        - Anti-Doping Unit
        - National Sports Council
        - Malaysia Stadium Corporation
        - National Sports Institute
        - Institute for Youth Research Malaysia
      - Deputy Secretary-General (Management)
        - Human Resources Management Division
        - Information Management Division
        - Management Services Division
        - Finance Division
        - Development Division
        - Account Division
      - Deputy Secretary-General (Strategic)
        - Policy and Strategic Planning Division
        - International Relations Division
        - Youth Skill Development Division
          - IKTBN/IKBN

=== Federal departments ===
1. National Department of Youth and Sports, or Jabatan Belia dan Sukan Negara (JBSN). (Official site)
2. Malaysia Sports Commissioner Office, or Pejabat Pesuruhjaya Sukan Malaysia (PPS). (Official site)
3. Registrar of Youth Office (ROY), or Pejabat Pendaftar Pertubuhan Belia. (Official site)

=== Federal agencies ===
1. National Sports Council of Malaysia (NSC), or Majlis Sukan Negara Malaysia (MSN). (Official site)
2. Malaysia Stadium Corporation, or Perbadanan Stadium Malaysia. (Official site)
3. National Sport Institute, or Institut Sukan Negara (ISN). (Official site)
4. Institute for Youth Research Malaysia, or Institut Penyelidikan Pembangunan Belia Malaysia (IPPBM). (Official site)
5. Youth and Sports Skill Training Institution, or Institusi Latihan Kemahiran Belia dan Sukan (ILKBS). (Official site)
6. Youth Parliament of Malaysia, or Parlimen Belia Malaysia. (Official site)
7. International Youth Centre, or Pusat Belia Antarabangsa. (Official site)
8. National Youth Consultative Council, or Majlis Perundingan Belia Negara (MPBN). (Official site)

== Key legislation ==
The Ministry of Youth and Sports is responsible for administration of several key Acts:

- National Sports Council of Malaysia Act 1971 [Act 29]
- Sports Development Act 1997 [Act 576]
- Youth Societies and Youth Development Act 2007 [Act 668]
- Perbadanan Stadium Malaysia Act 2010 [Act 717]
- National Sports Institute Act 2011 [Act 729]

== Policy Priorities of the Government of the Day ==
- National Youth Policy
- National Sports Policy

== Programmes ==
- Putrajaya Youth Festival
- National Sports Day
- 1Malaysia Skilled Youth Program
- e-Youth System
- Malaysian Youth Map Application
- No Reason! Sports For All, Active Malaysia, Towards Active, Healthy, United Malaysia

== Ministers ==
Minister	Portrait	Office	Executive Experience
Mohammed Taufiq Johari		Minister of Youth and Sports	MP for Sungai Petani (November 2022 – current)
Mordi Bimol		Deputy Minister of Youth and Sports	MP for Mas Gading (May 2018 – current)

== See also ==
- Minister of Youth and Sports (Malaysia)
