= Youth and Parliament =

Annual event of the German Bundestag

Youth and Parliament (German: Jugend und Parlament) is usually an annual event of the German Bundestag. Among its offerings, it plays a special role because (along with state files and the Federal Assembly) it is the only opportunity for non-MPs, members of the Federal Government and members of the Bundesrat to enter the plenary hall of the Reichstag building and hold meetings there.

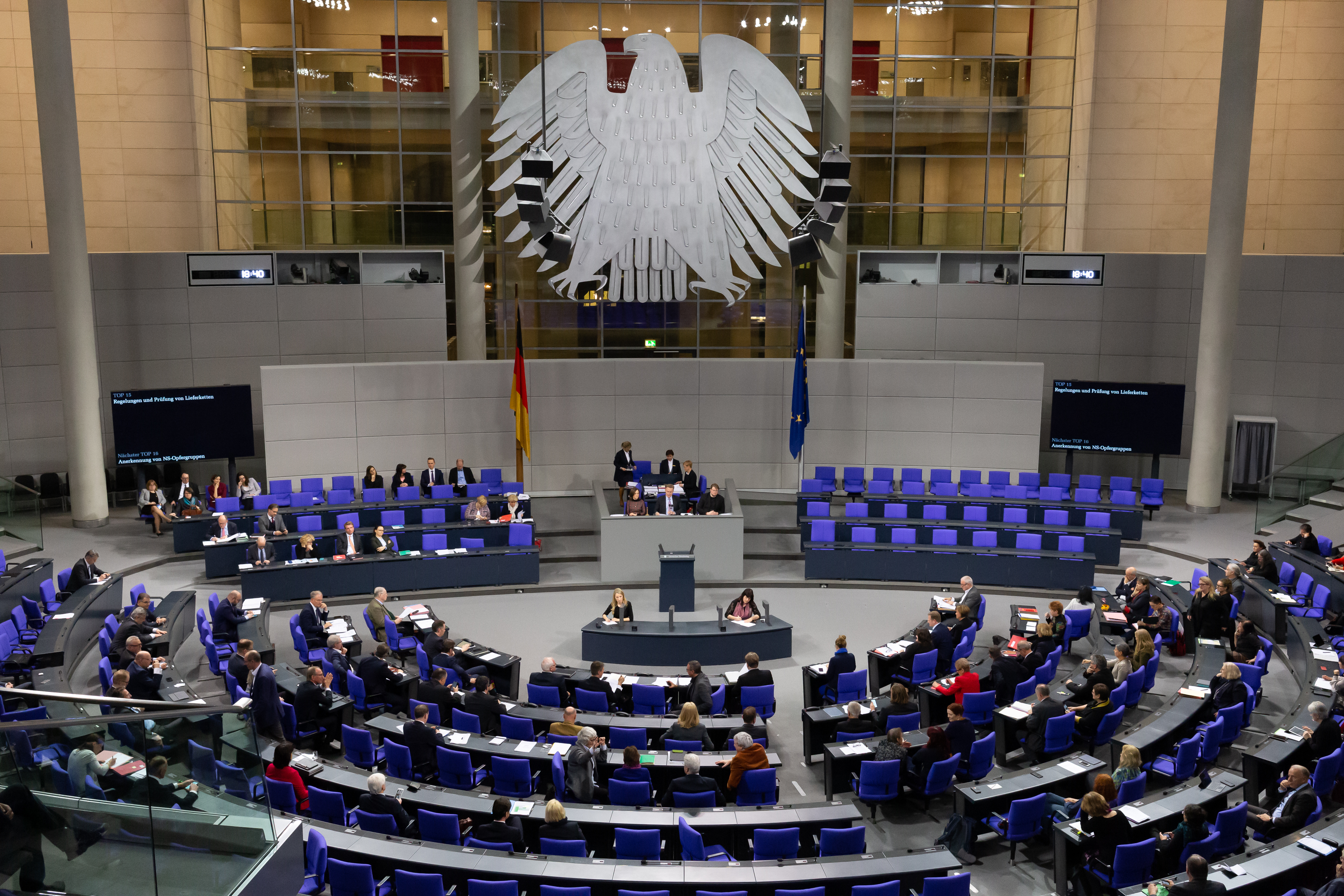
The plenary hall of the Reichstag building

From 1981 to 2003, the event consisted of discussion forums on various current topics, where the young participants could exchange ideas with members of the Bundestag.

Since 2004, "Youth and Parliament" has been a large-scale business game, in which 315 participants between the ages of 17 and 20 take on the role of members of the Bundestag for 4 days. The participants are nominated by the MPs. All of the participants will be randomly divided into three groups. Each participant receives a fictitious identity.All in all, the "JuP Bundestag" existing for 4 days corresponds statistically - in terms of age, family, job, educational background and geographical origin - to the real Bundestag.

The participants "live through" the entire legislative process from the introduction to discussions in parliamentary groups and working groups, the first consultation in plenary, the committee deliberations, the final discussions in the fractions to the second and third consultation in plenary. Since 2006, the event has regularly concluded with a comparison of the experience of the participants with that of real MEPs, usually represented by the leaders of the political groups.

The primary goal of the game is not to convey political content, but through citizenship and political education how the parliamentary apparatus works.

The simulation game "Youth and Parliament" is a variant of the simulation game Parlamentarische Demokratie spielerisch erfahren "Parliamentary democracy in a playful way", which is also offered by the visitor service of the German Bundestag.

In 2019 there was a protest action against the climate policy of the German government. Several young people lay down on the floor in front of the lectern and showed a banner.

== See also ==
- Youth council
