= Vasyl Myroshnychenko =

Ukrainian diplomat

- Василь Мирошниченко
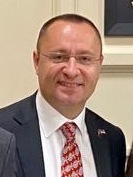
- Myroshnychenko in 2022

Ambassador of Ukraine to Australia
- Incumbent
- Assumed office 2022
- President: Volodymyr Zelenskyy

Personal details
- Born: 19 June 1981 (age 45) Ternopil, Ukrainian SSR, Soviet Union
- Education: Kyiv University

Vasyl Volodymyrovych Myroshnychenko (Ukrainian: Васи́ль Володи́мирович Мирошниче́нко; born June 19, 1981) is an Ambassador of Ukraine to Australia since March 2022. Adviser to the Minister of Defense of Ukraine (on a voluntary basis) since March 7, 2022. He is also the CEO and Partner at CFC Big Ideas.

== Early life ==
Myroshnychenko was born in Ternopil on June 12, 1981, in a family of doctors. He graduated from a comprehensive school in Volochysk, Khmelnytsky region.

== Education ==
Myroshnychenko studied at the Institute of International Relations of the Taras Shevchenko National University of Kyiv where by 2003 he obtained bachelor's and master's degrees in international relations with honors. In the summer of 2002, he participated in the Global Village for Future Leaders of Business and Industry program, Iacocca Institute, Lehigh University, US.

Later, between 2005 and 2006, Myroshnychenko attended London School of Economics and Political Science, London, UK, where he defended the dissertation on "The mechanisms of attracting foreign direct investments". In 2008, he started his subsequent studies at the Management Program of the Swedish Institute Stockholm, Sweden.

In May 2014, he took an intensive two-week course run by the Center for Congressional and Presidential Studies at American University, Institute of Advocacy and Public Affairs.

== Career ==
=== Early public service career ===
Myroshnychenko started his public service activities as an intern at the Public Affairs Section in the Embassy of the United States of America in the 1999 and 2000. Followed by an internship as an Assistant to the Member of Parliament House of Commons, Parliament of Canada, Ottawa, Canada as a part of the Canada-Ukraine Parliamentary Program in 2001. Upon completing the internship, Myroshnychenko co-founded the youth public organization "European Youth Parliament - Ukraine" of which he was the president for the next 3 years.

=== CFC Big Ideas ===
After coming back from the internships in the governmental bodies in the US and Canada, Myroshnychenko came back to Ukraine and founded CFC Big Ideas in 2002. He is currently a CEO and Partner at the company. During the Ukrainian Revolution of Dignity in 2014, he co-founded and headed Ad Hoc Projects of Ukraine Crisis Media Center, NGO and media organization Kyiv, Ukraine, up to 2016.

Vasyl has advised many multinational companies and domestic industry leaders across different sectors. He currently sits on the board of the Ukrainian-British City Club, a London-based organization set up in 2005 to promote the UK-Ukraine trade and investment relations.

Since 2021, acting as a Member of the Supervisory Board of State Enterprise Ukraine Institute.

=== Ukrainian Ambassador to Australia and New Zealand ===
On 9 March 2022 was appointed as an Extraordinary and Plenipotentiary Ambassador of Ukraine to Australia. In early April 2022, Myroshnychenko met with Australian Defence Minister Peter Dutton to discuss the purchase of Bushmaster vehicles and Australian assistance in documenting and prosecuting alleged Russian war crimes.

In July 2022, Myroshnychenko welcomed the incoming Albanese government's announcement that Australia would provide A$100 million worth of aid to Ukraine following Prime Minister Anthony Albanese's state visit to Ukraine. He also indicated that Ukraine would welcome the expulsion of the Russian Ambassador to Australia against the backdrop of deteriorating Australian-Russian relations.

In early August 2022, Myroshnychenko commenced negotiations with the Education Minister to allow Ukrainian students to study in Australian universities at lower rates than domestic students due to the ongoing Russian invasion of Ukraine. In mid–August, Myroshnychenko visited New Zealand in his capacity as Ukrainian Ambassador to New Zealand and met several senior New Zealand officials including Defence Minister Peeni Henare, Speaker of the House Trevor Mallard, and Foreign Minister Nanaia Mahuta. Myroshnychenko urged New Zealand to lift tariffs on Ukrainian goods and support his wartorn country. He also expressed interest in negotiating a free trade agreement with New Zealand.

== Charity ==
He has been a member of the Kyiv circle of friends of the Ukrainian Catholic University since 2008. From 2012 to 2017 and from 2019 to 2021 he headed the organizing committee of the UCU Charity Evening in Kyiv. He also supports the national scout organization Plast.

== Awards and honours ==
- Medal for Assistance to the Armed Forces of Ukraine (2023)

== Personal life and hobbies ==
Myroshnychenko is married and has two children. Myroshnychenko participated in 6 marathons, including Lisbon (2019), Istanbul (2020), Antalya (2021), Madrid (2021) and two individual marathons. He is also fond of open water swimming and cycling and has participated in the Oceanman amateur competition.

== Publications ==
- Article "Business Sense: Ways to start fixing Ukraine's already horrible image abroad", KyivPost, December 3, 2009
- Article "Now is the perfect moment to strengthen ties with Ukraine", CapX, July 8, 2020
- Article "UK and Ukraine sign a historic post-Brexit free trade deal", Atlantic Council, October 12, 2020
