= Maine Legislature =

Bicameral legislature of Maine

Maine State Legislature

Type
- Type: Bicameral
- Chambers: Senate; House of Representatives
- Term limits: 4 terms (8 years)

Leadership
- Senate President: Mattie Daughtry (D) since December 4, 2024
- House Speaker: Ryan Fecteau (D) since December 4, 2024

Structure
- Seats: 186; 35 Senators; 151 Representatives (plus 3 non-voting Representatives not shown in diagrams below)
- Senate political groups: Democratic (20); Republican (14); Independent (1)
- House of Representatives political groups: Democratic (75); Republican (73); Independent (3); Nonpartisan (2 non-voting); Vacant (1 non-voting)
- Length of term: Both chambers: 2 years

Elections
- Last Senate election: November 3, 2026
- Last House of Representatives election: November 3, 2026
- Next Senate election: November 7, 2028
- Next House of Representatives election: November 7, 2028
- Redistricting: Legislative control

Motto
- Dirigo

Meeting place
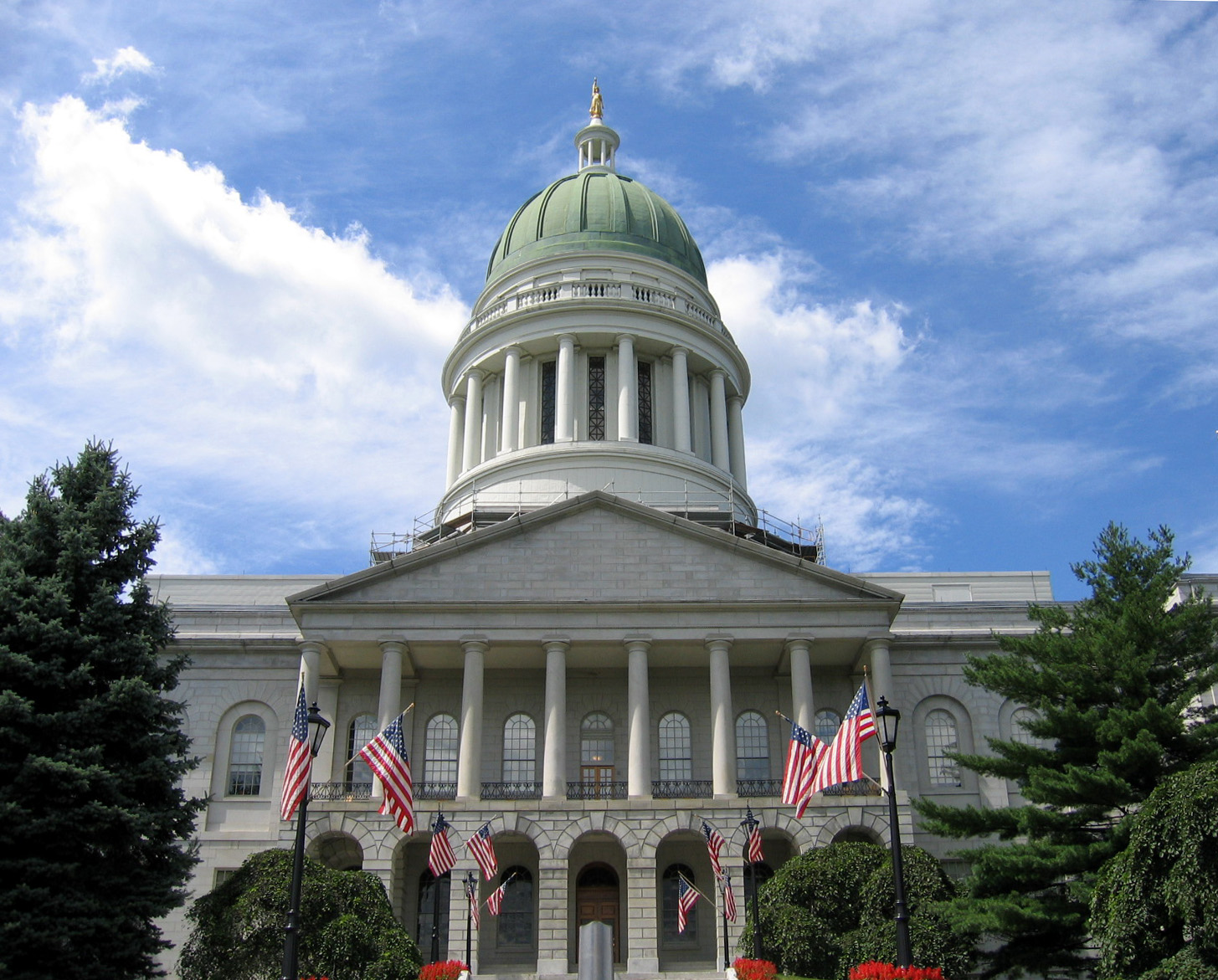
- Maine State House; Augusta

Website
- Maine State Legislature

Constitution
- Constitution of Maine

The Maine State Legislature is the state legislature of the U.S. state of Maine. It is a bicameral body composed of the lower house Maine House of Representatives and the upper house Maine Senate. The legislature convenes at the State House in Augusta, where it has met since 1832.

The House of Representatives consists of 151 members, each chosen from single-member constituencies. The House is uniquely the only state legislative body in the U.S. to set aside special seats for American Indians, where there are three non-voting Representatives from the Penobscot Nation, the Passamaquoddy Tribe, and the Houlton Band of Maliseets. The Senate currently has 35 members. However, under the Maine Constitution, there may be 31, 33, or 35.

== History ==
In 1922, Dora Pinkham became the first woman elected to the Maine State Legislature, serving first in the House and then in the Senate.

In 1823, the Penobscot tribe sent what is believed to be their first representative to the Maine Senate. In 1842, the Passamaquoddy tribe also sent their first representative. It appears that before Maine's statehood, Massachusetts allowed the tribes to send in representatives. It is not known what role the representatives played in the legislature until 1907, when records began to be kept, including documentation of where they sat, what they said when they spoke, and the privileges granted to them. While the representatives tried to achieve higher status in the legislature, in 1941 legislation was passed to remove them from the Hall of House, meaning they held very little power, aside from the persuasive power granted by being in the capital. It was not until 1975 that the representatives were once again allowed into the chamber, with seating and speaking privileges. In 1996, tribe representatives tried to co-sponsor a bill, and in 1999, the tribes were formally allowed to co-sponsor bills. On 2001, this rule change allowed for Donna Loring to push for a bill, "An Act to Require Teaching Maine Native American History and Culture in Maine's Schools" to require all public and private schools in the state to teach about Maine history, including Native American history. This act was signed by Governor Angus King in 2001.

The Houlton Band of Maliseets received representation in 2012. Thus far, the Mi'kmaq Nation has not been granted representation.

In 2015, the Passamaquoddy and Penobscot pulled their representatives from the legislature in protest of growing tension between the tribes and the state government, including Governor Paul LePage. As of the 2018 election, only the Passamaquoddy tribe have returned to the legislature, while the Maliseets have departed and the Penobscot have yet to return.

== Qualifications ==
=== House of Representatives ===
To be a member of the Maine House of Representatives, one must be at least 21 years of age, have been a citizen of the United States for five years, have been a resident of Maine for one year, and for the 3 months next preceding the time of this person's election shall have been and during the period for which elected continue to be, a resident in the district represented.

=== Senate ===
To be a member of the Maine Senate, one must be at least 25 years of age, have been a citizen of the United States for five years, have been a resident of Maine for one year, and for the 3 months next preceding the time of this person's election shall have been and during the period for which elected continue to be, a resident in the district represented.

== Elections ==
Legislative elections are held in November of every even-numbered year, during the state's general election. The terms for both houses are two years. Since 1996, members of both the House and Senate have been limited to four two-year terms, a consecutive, rather than a lifetime, limit. Members who have served the limit are re-eligible after two years.

Until 1880, the legislature was elected for a one-year term. Starting in 1881, an amendment to the Maine Constitution took effect, providing for two-year terms, the current length.

== Sessions ==
The legislature meets in two separate sessions. The first session begins the first Wednesday in December, following the general election, and continues into the following year. The second session begins on the first Tuesday in January of the next year, the same year as the next general election. The second session is typically short and deals with a limited number of bills per the Maine Constitution, which are budgetary matters, legislation submitted by the governor, bills held over from the first session, citizen initiatives, and legislation deemed to be an 'emergency'. According to the Constitution, emergency legislation is supposed to be legislation for an immediate need to protect public peace, health, or safety, but that provision is often broadly interpreted.

The governor of Maine may also call the legislature into a special session for "extraordinary occasions." The Governor and the Senate President may also call the Senate into session to confirm gubernatorial appointments.

== Powers ==
As the legislative branch of the Maine state government, the legislature has the power to make laws, subject to a veto by the governor. The legislature, however, may override the veto by a two-thirds vote in each house. The legislature also has the power to propose constitutional amendments by a two-thirds vote in each house; the proposal must be approved by a majority of voters in a referendum to be passed.

Unlike other states, the legislature is responsible for electing the attorney general, state treasurer, and secretary of state. Most states give this responsibility to gubernatorial appointments or an election by the people at large.

== Practices ==
=== Committees ===
Unlike committees in most state legislatures, most standing committees in the Maine State Legislature are Joint committees with members from both the House and Senate. As of 2024, the following joint committees are in operation:

- Agriculture, Conservation and Forestry (ACF)
- Appropriations and Financial Affairs (AFA)
- Criminal Justice and Public Safety (CJPS)
- Education and Cultural Affairs (EDU)
- Energy, Utilities and Technology (EUT)
- Environment and Natural Resources (ENR)
- Government Oversight Committee (GOC)
- Health and Human Services (HHS)
- Health Coverage, Insurance and Financial Services (HCIFS)
- Inland Fisheries and Wildlife (IFW)
- Innovation, Development, Economic Advancement, and Business (IDEA)
- Joint Select Committee on Housing (HOU)
- Joint Select Committee on Joint Rules (JTR)
- Judiciary (JUD)
- Labor and Housing (LBHS)
- Marine Resources (MAR)
- State and Local Government (SLG)
- Taxation (TAX)
- Transportation (TRA)
- Veterans and Legal Affairs (VLA)

The Senate and House have only a few separate committees:

- Bills in the Second Reading (House and Senate)
- Engrossed Bills (House and Senate)
- Ethics ("Ethics" in the House, "Conduct and Ethics" in the Senate)
- Rules ("Rules and Business of the House" in the House, "Senate Rules" in the Senate)
- Leaves of Absence (House)
- Elections (House)
- Senatorial Vote (Senate)

In addition, a Legislative Council, which manages the overall business of the legislature, comprises the President of the Senate, the Speaker of the House, the Republican and Democratic Floor Leaders for both the Senate and House of Representatives, and their Assistant Floor Leaders. A Legislative Budget Subcommittee, which is a subcommittee of the Legislative Council, reviews the proposed legislative budget and sends its recommendations to the Council for approval.

=== Legislation ===
Unlike other state legislatures (save for the unicameral Nebraska Legislature), the Maine State Legislature uses a unified numbering system for bills. Bills are assigned a House or Senate Paper number (depending on their originating chamber) and a unified "Legislative Document" ("LD") number, both of which remain constant until the end of the session.

== See also ==
- Maine State House
- Maine House of Representatives
- Maine Senate
- List of Maine state legislatures
- Maine Legislative Youth Advisory Council
