= Revised European Charter on the Participation of Young People in Local and Regional Life =

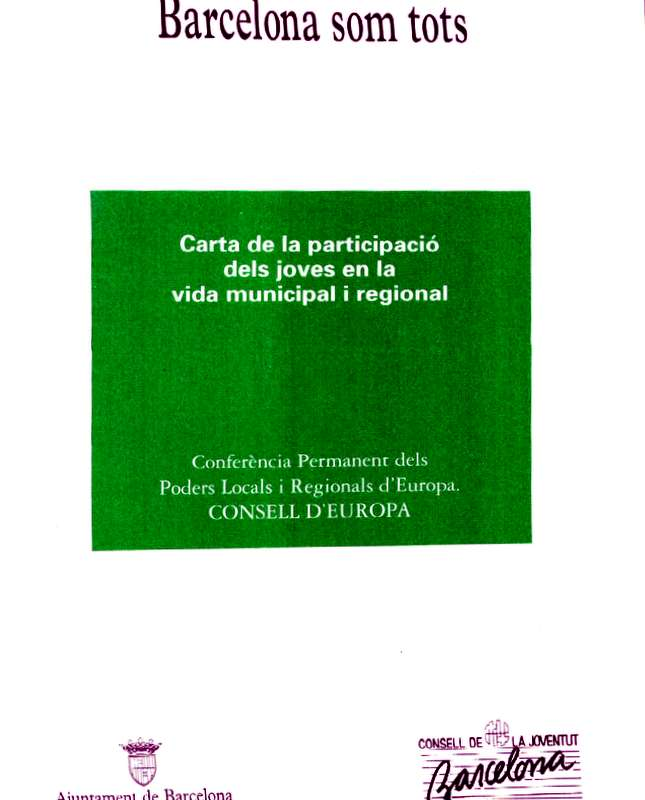

The Revised European Charter on the Participation of Young People in Local and Regional Life is an international policy document to promote youth participation at the local level. Since its adoption by the Congress of the Council of Europe in 2003 it has achieved wide recognition as a key reference policy document for the political participation of youth.

The original charter was drawn up in 1992, but was substantially revised to take into account the rapidly changing political environment. The Charter has been adopted by many European municipalities who have chosen to set up youth councils. The revised Charter was taken up by the Committee of Ministers of the Council of Europe in a recommendation. lending it added political weight. A number of European NGOs, such as the European Youth Forum actively support the Charter through their activities. It has been translated into eleven languages, plus a plain English version and manual entitled “Have your say”.

The Charter is divided into three sections. Part one gives local and regional authorities guidelines on how to conduct policies affecting young people; part two provides some tools for furthering the participation of young people; the third part advises on how to provide institutional conditions for the participation of young people.

It is referenced on many youth websites as a major policy instrument.
