= Washington State Legislative Youth Advisory Council =

Council created to advise Washington State Legislature on youth issues

Washington Legislative Youth Advisory Council
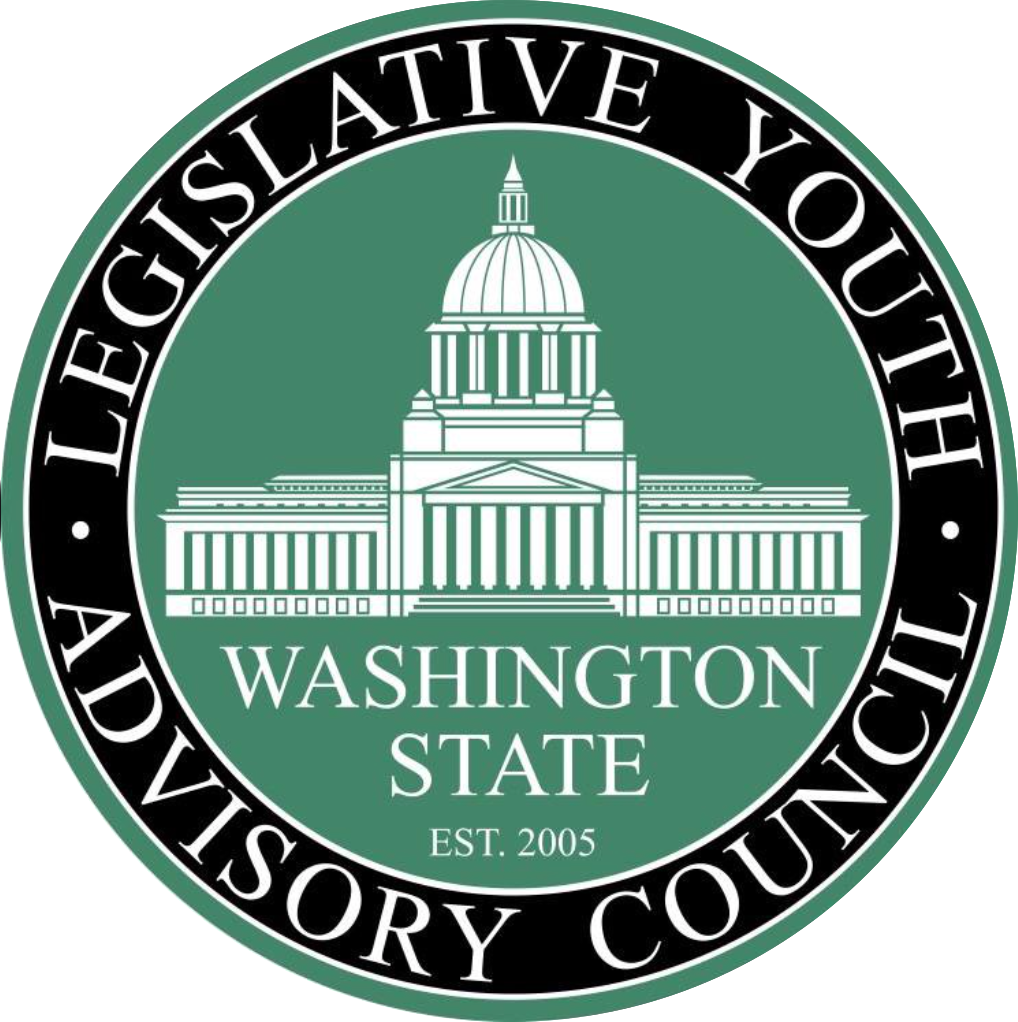
- Abbreviation: LYAC
- Formation: 2005
- Founder: Washington State Legislature
- Type: Governmental organization
- Region served: Washington State
- Website: walyac.org

The Washington State Legislative Youth Advisory Council (LYAC) is the official nonpartisan youth advisory body to the Washington State Legislature on issues related to young people in Washington. Created in July 2005, it consists of approximately 22 members, each serving a two-year term. According to state law, the mission of LYAC is to "examine issues of importance to youth, including but not limited to education, employment, strategies to increase youth participation in state and municipal government, safe environments for youth, substance abuse, emotional and physical health, foster care, poverty, homelessness, and youth access to services on a statewide and municipal basis."

LYAC is administered by the Office of the Lieutenant Governor of Washington. From 2020 to 2021, the Council was administered in collaboration with the nonprofit Washington State Leadership Board. In addition to its work with the legislature, LYAC has collaborated with other state government agencies, including the Office of the Attorney General of Washington, the Washington State Department of Health, the Office of Superintendent of Public Instruction (OSPI), and the Washington Department of Children, Youth, and Families.

== History ==
=== Funding and Administration ===
LYAC was initially proposed by 12-year-old Alex Jonlin, who envisioned a “bureau of children’s opinions” to finally incorporate youth into discussions of major youth policy. Jonlin worked with his state senator, Ken Jacobsen, to create an organization founded on authentic youth engagement and involvement. With the passage of Senate Bill (SB) 5254 in 2005, LYAC was established as a pilot program with a sunset clause which took effect in 2007. Then-Governor Christine Gregoire, in collaboration with the legislature, appointed the first 22 members. The OSPI was designated to provide staff support and administration, but no funding was offered by the legislature to support this. However, unpaid cooperation between Washington State Senate staff, OSPI staff, and LYAC enabled the students to launch the initiative successfully.

In 2007, with the passage of House Bill (HB) 1052, LYAC's sunset clause was moved back to 2009. This legislation also adjusted the member appointment process, so that the council itself selected new youth members based on its own established criteria. New acceptances were notified by the Lieutenant Governor. HB 1052 also codified the ability of LYAC to accept grants and donations. The 2007-2009 legislative budget also included dedicated funding to LYAC for the first time, in addition to a Civic Education Travel Grant from the OSPI that allowed students to travel from around the state to take part in LYAC-hosted events.

In 2009, the sunset clause was removed entirely. However, due to the ongoing Recession, LYAC lost its funding from the legislature and was entirely dependent on the support of volunteers and private donations. It was not until 2019 that the council once again began receiving appropriations from the state. In 2020, a new law was passed allowing collaboration in the facilitation of LYAC between the Office of the Lieutenant Governor and the Washington State Leadership Board, a nonprofit authorized by state law.

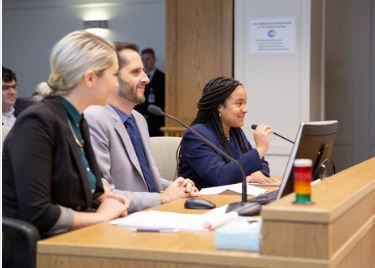
A LYAC member testifies in a committee hearing.

=== Successful Legislation ===
One of the codified responsibilities of LYAC is to advise the legislature on "proposed and pending legislation." As a result, each year the council lobbies legislators and testifies in committee hearings on behalf of legislation it feels positively impacts youth. LYAC also writes and passes its own legislation, such as HB 1373. Below is a non-comprehensive list of LYAC-endorsed legislation that has passed into law.

Successful Legislation Endorsed by LYAC
Bill	Purpose	Year Passed
SB 5093	Expands healthcare opportunities for low-income youth	2007
HB 1131	Provides children in foster care access to college financial aid	2007
HB 1201	Expands Medicaid access to 21-year-olds	2007
SB 5297	Ensures scientifically accurate sexual education in schools	2007
SB 5098	Guarantees college tuition for certain low-income youth	2007
SB 5991	Requires employees of higher education institutions to report observations of child abuse	2012
SB 5895	Standardizes evaluation systems for teachers and principals	2012
HB 1291	Establishes a council to combat sex trafficking	2013
HB 1404	Establishes a penalty for retail liquor licenses when alcohol is sold to those under 21	2013
HB 1412	Requires school districts to provide incentives for students who participate in community service	2013
HB 1651	Protects privacy for juvenile court records	2014
HB 1724	Prohibits statements made by a juvenile during a mental health screening from being admitted as evidence	2014
HB 1682	Creates a grant program to sponsor school-housing partnerships for homeless youth	2016
HB 1513	Establishes voter pre-registration for teens age 16 and 17 at the DMV and other government entities	2018
SB 5395	Requires comprehensive sexual education in public schools	2020
SB 6066	Expands access to ethnic studies materials and resources for public school students in K-6	2020
HB 1660	Closes the gap in extracurricular participation by low income students	2020
HB 1373	Promotes student access to information about behavioral health resources	2021
HB 1356	Prohibits the use of Native American names, symbols, or images as public school mascots	2021
HB 1365	Procures computers and devices for public schools students and staff	2021
SB 5044	Includes equity, cultural competency, and anti-racism in teacher professional learning	2021
HB 1140	Requires juvenile access to attorneys when contacted by law enforcement	2021
HB 1225	Expands funding and support for school-based health centers	2021
HB 1302	Expands the College in the High School program	2021
SB 5299	Allows the use of computer science credits for graduation	2021

== Activities of the Council ==
RCW 43.15.095 outlines the council's duties as follows:

- Advising the legislature on proposed and pending legislation, including state budget expenditures and policy matters relating to youth.
- Advising the standing committees of the legislature and study commissions, committees, and task forces regarding issues relating to youth.
- Conducting periodic seminars for its members regarding leadership, government, and the legislature.
- Accepting and soliciting for grants and donations from public and private sources to support the activities of the council.
- Reporting annually by December 1 to the legislature on its activities, including proposed legislation that implements recommendations of the council.

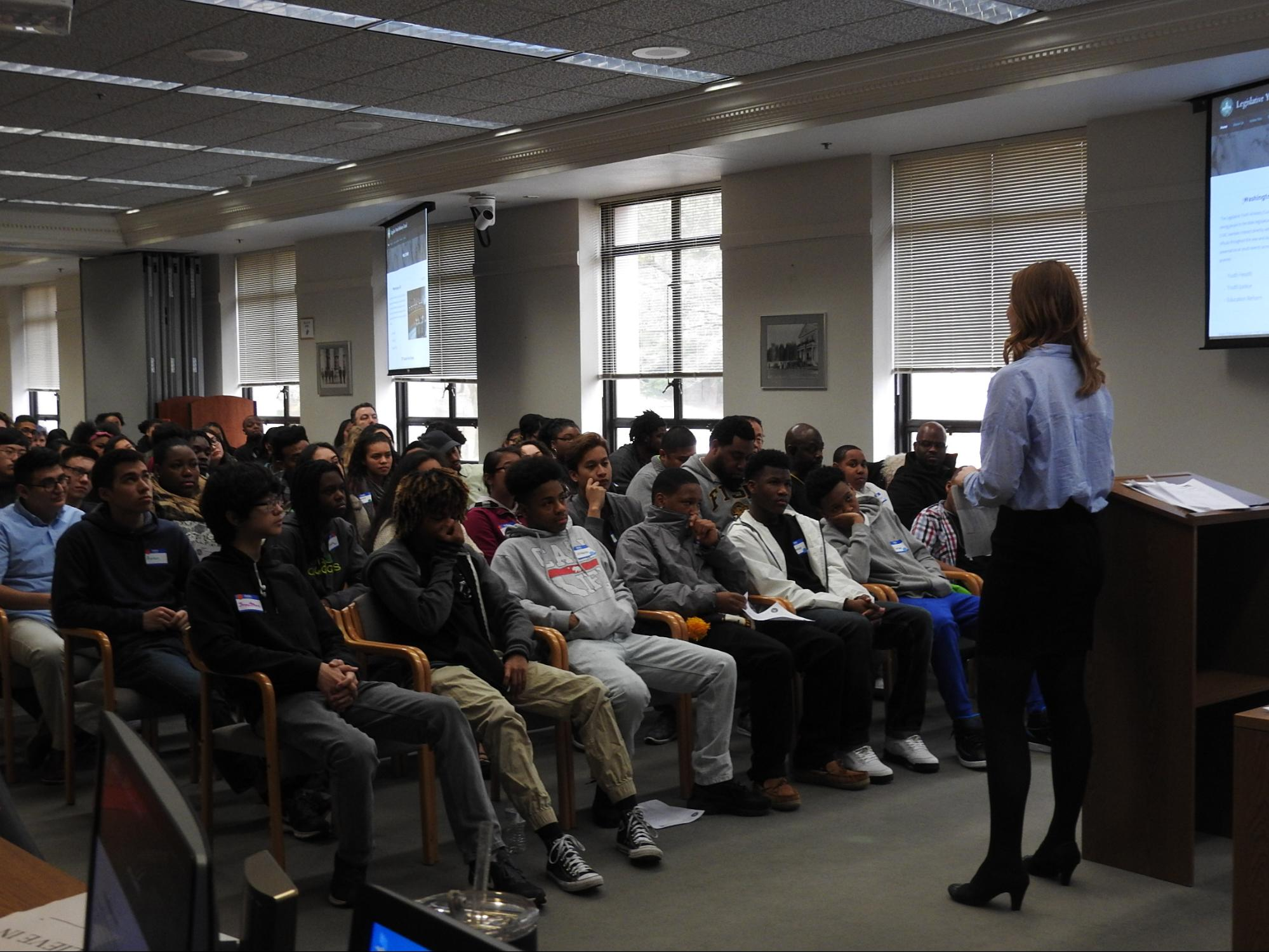
Attendees at the 2017 Action Day

However, the projects LYAC has pursued in recent years have expanded much beyond its minimum duties. In 2008, the council launched Action Day, an annual event that has since brought together thousands of youth from around the state to the Washington State Capitol. Attendees of the event have had the chance to listen to speakers including, but not limited to: Governor Jay Inslee, Lieutenant Governor Denny Heck, Lieutenant Governor Cyrus Habib, Attorney General Bob Ferguson, Superintendent of Public Instruction Chris Reykdal, Secretary of State Kim Wyman, State Treasurer Mike Pelliciotti, Assistant Majority Whip Senator Claire Wilson, Secretary of the Senate Brad Hendrickson, Educational Consultant Erin Jones, and Mockingbird Society Executive Director Annie Blackledge. At Action Day, attendees also have the opportunity to learn from workshops hosted by LYAC, connect with peers from around the state, and apply newly learned skills in advocacy meetings with legislators.

LYAC has also hosted other events, including town halls and workshops about the McCleary Decision, civic engagement, the council's legislative priorities, and nonverbal communication. During the 2020 election, the council hosted virtual interviews with the candidates for governor and lieutenant governor about youth issues.

LYAC frequently supports task forces and work groups hosted by various state government agencies. In 2019, the council advised the OSPI's Comprehensive Sexual Health Education Workgroup, whose recommendations led to SB 5395, which required comprehensive sexual education in public schools. LYAC endorsed and lobbied for the successful bill, which was later reaffirmed with the passage of Washington Referendum 90. The efforts were later covered in Teen Vogue. In 2020, the council partnered with the Washington state Office of the Attorney General on the creation of a 24-hour statewide hotline for receiving information related to youth safety and well-being. The same year, members advised the state Department of Health on COVID-19 vaccine distribution prioritization and worked with the OSPI on its From Seed to Apple initiative.

LYAC collaborates year-round with many community organizations around the state in order to more accurately represent youth opinion, support the mission of those groups, and promote increased civic engagement.

== Recognition ==
- In 2012, as part of the Washington state legislature, LYAC won the Kevin B. Harrington Award.
- In 2014, LYAC won the Colleen Willoughby Youth Civic Engagement Award.
- In 2015, LYAC was a Harvard Kennedy School Innovations in American Government Award Semi-Finalist.
- In 2017, LYAC was recognized as a Harvard Kennedy School Bright Idea.

The work of LYAC has been covered in the AP, Washington Post, Q-13 Fox, KIRO Seattle, The Seattle Times, The U.S. News & World Report, Teen Vogue, KING-5, KNKX, the San Francisco Chronicle, The Spokesman Review, MasonWebTV, OPB News, YakTri News, EIN News, The Yakima Herald-Republic, the Times Union, Sequim Gazette, Centralia Chronicle, Seattle Medium, South Seattle Emerald, GzKATU, The News Tribune, the Fairfield Citizen, the Houston Chronicle, Seattle PI, Beaumont Enterprise, CTpost, Greenwich Times, News Times, Magic Valley, RegisteredCitizen, The Reflector, South Whidbey Record, Michigan's Thumb, The Ridgefield Press, KTVZ Idaho, KXLY, KHQ, Washington Law & Politics, and TV Washington.

In 2008, LYAC worked with the state of Indiana's Department of Education in the creation of a Legislative Youth Advisory Council there. LYAC has advised the states of California, New York, Massachusetts, New York, and Virginia in their efforts to pursue a similar idea in years since. In 2016, members met with international leaders at the World Affairs Council of Seattle to brainstorm the applicability of LYAC's mission on a global scale in countries such as Saudi Arabia, Sudan, and Mexico. There are also youth councils established in the states of Louisiana, Maryland, and Colorado, though it is unknown whether Washington LYAC had an advisory role in their creation.
