= European Youth Parliament =

International educational charity

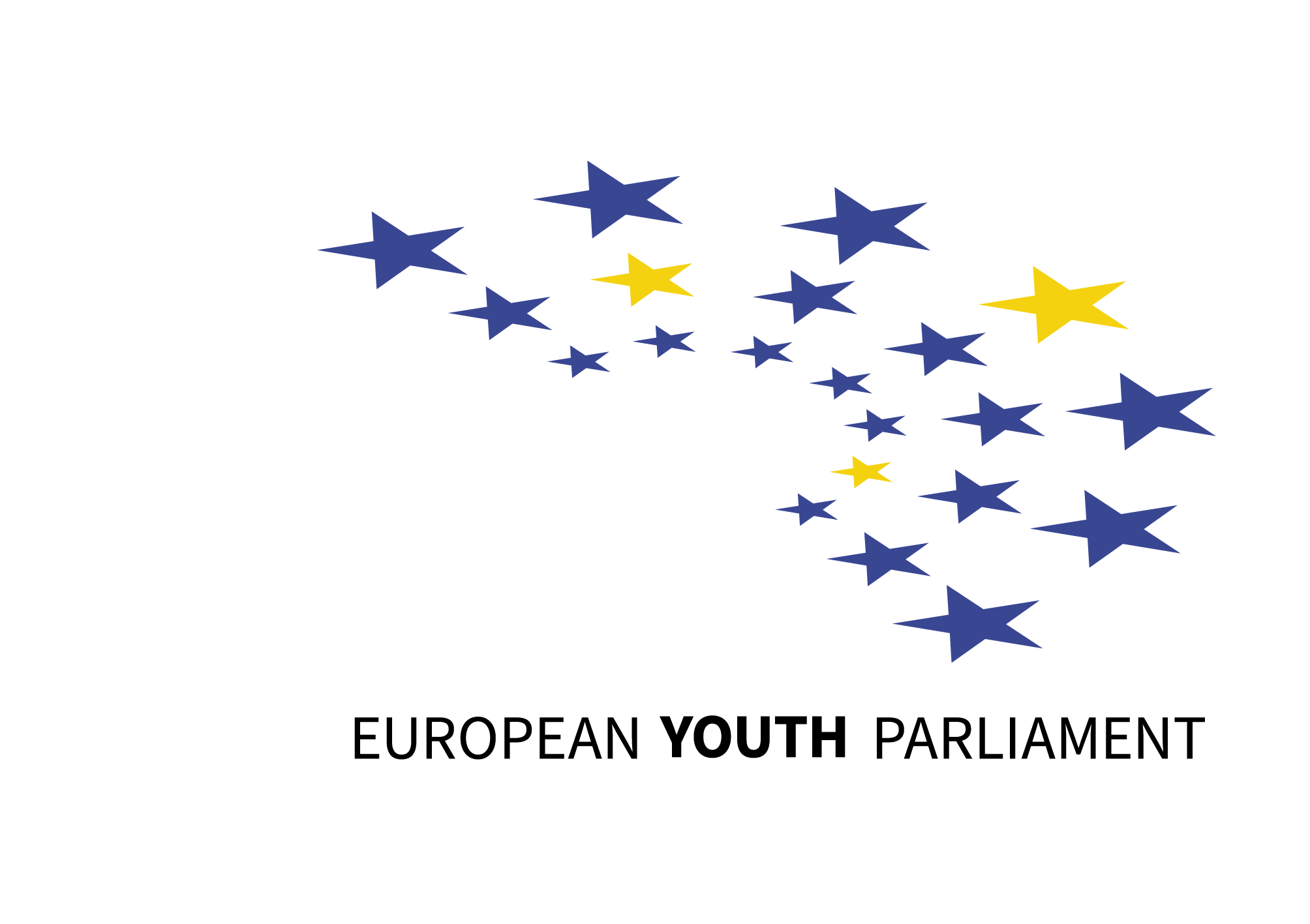
- Founded: 1987
- Founder: Bettina Carr-Allinson (NL) and Laurent Grégoire (FR)
- Type: Educational Charity
- Purpose: Internationalism
- Location: Berlin, Germany
- Origins: Fontainebleau, France
- Region served: Europe
- Key people: Anya Suprunenko (Executive Director)
- Volunteers: 50,000+
- Website: eyp.org

The European Youth Parliament (EYP) is the youth parliament for Europe. Legally an independent educational charity, it is a politically unbound non-profit organisation, which encourages European youth to actively engage in citizenship and cultural understanding. It annually involves around 25,000 youth from across Europe in its events and has around 6,000 active members in 40 countries. It was established in 1987 in Fontainebleau, France, as the first youth parliament in the world.

The EYP operates in 40 European countries, both inside and outside the European Union.. To become a member, a person must either take part in a multi-day session of the charity or pay a fee.

== History ==
The European Youth Parliament was founded by Laurent Grégoire (FR) and Bettina Carr-Allinson (NL), initially, as a school project at the Lycée François-Ier in Fontainebleau, to the south of Paris. It is there that three of the first four International Sessions were held, starting in 1988, about a year after the idea took place.

It then developed steadily for a few years until it moved to Witney, Oxfordshire, in 1991, and was legally recognised as the European Youth Parliament International Ltd., a subsidiary of a charity created in 1992 for this purpose, the Fontainebleau Youth Foundation. The organisation experienced enduring growth for the next ten years, its network counting an increasing number of National Committees and its activities becoming both larger and more numerous. The National Committees stretch beyond the scope of countries within the European Union and try to encompass all European countries.

In the years 2001 to 2004, the EYP encountered various problems of financial nature. On 4 November 2004, however, the European Youth Parliament was reborn due to a mutual agreement between representatives of EYP's Board of National Committees, alumni and the Heinz-Schwarzkopf Foundation. The EYP's status since then has been a programme of the Schwarzkopf-Stiftung Junges Europa, and is hosted in Berlin, Germany.

The actual activities of the EYP never faltered during this period.

Since 2004, the EYP has introduced several reforms to introduce more transparency in its institutions and further enlarged its activities.

The COVID-19 pandemic lead to many EYP events moving to a digital platform.

Currently the Charity has two patrons that are members of the Comité d’Honneur of the European Youth Parliament, Ursula von der Leyen, President of the European Commission and Roberta Metsola, President of the European Parliament.

== Management ==
At the international level, the EYP is governed by an international board, the Governing Body. The Governing Body has six members elected by the National Committees and by the alumni of past sessions. A representative of the Schwarzkopf Foundation, as well as the EYP's executive director, are also members. The board is largely responsible for the quality assurance of the International Sessions but also takes responsibility for the overall direction of the organisation and the long-term sustainability and protection of the organisation. The day-to-day business of the organisation is administered by a hired manager at the International Office in Berlin. Philipp J. Scharff was the manager from 2004 until 2008, Jan Phillip Beck (DE) from 2008 until 2011, Ville Vasaramäki (FI) from 2011 until 2013, Krista Lagus (FI) from 2013 until 2017 and Lukas Fendel (DE) from 2017 to 2020. Anya Suprunenko was appointed as Executive Director in 2020. In 2022, Pauline Chetail (FR) was made acting Executive Director as Anya went on temporary leave.

The branch of EYP in each country is known as its National Committee (NC). The National Committees are free to choose how to manage themselves, provided they comply with basic democratic principles. The National Committees are responsible for organising and funding sessions of the EYP within their jurisdictions, this includes both regional and national sessions. International Sessions, however, can receive limited funding from the international office. Sessions finances are usually supplemented through partnerships with companies and other organisations.

Apart from the National Committees, there can be Autonomous Committees (ACs) as well, which represent Autonomous European Territory which has been recognized by a majority of the member states of the Council of Europe.

The National Committees meet twice a year for the Board of National Committees (BNC). There they discuss and vote on implementation of proposals put forward by members of the EYP. The event is moderated by the BNC board, consisting of three members of different National Committees elected to the role.

== List of National/Autonomous Committees and Initiatives ==
=== National Committees ===
- Albania
- Armenia
- Austria
- Azerbaijan
- Belgium
- Bosnia and Herzegovina
- Bulgaria
- Croatia
- Cyprus
- (Czech Republic) Czechia
- Denmark
- Estonia [note 1]
- Finland
- France
- (Georgia (country)) Georgia [note 2]
- Germany
- Greece
- (Republic of Ireland) Ireland
- Italy
- Latvia
- Lithuania [note 3]
- Luxembourg
- Netherlands
- Norway
- Poland
- Portugal
- Romania
- Serbia
- Slovakia
- Slovenia
- Spain
- Sweden
- Switzerland
- (Turkey) Türkiye
- Ukraine
- United Kingdom

=== National Initiatives ===
- Hungary
- Malta
- Moldova
- North Macedonia

=== Candidate Autonomous Committees ===
- Kosovo

=== Former National Committees ===
- Belarus [note 4]
- Russia

=== Former Candidate National Committees ===
- Iceland

[note 1] - this national committee has a different name of Active young people of Estonia, Tegusad Eesti Noored in estonian, to the regular EYP format but is still connected to the wider network.

[note 2] - this national committee is described as dormant on the official network website.

[note 3] - this national committee is still described as a candidate.

[note 4] - this national committee was shut down by the government of Belarus sighting anti nationalist sentiment of the charity.

Main Source:

== Events ==
There are a number of different types of events organised across the network.

=== Types of Events ===
==== Sessions ====
Debate Events within the EYP are generally known as a 'session'. Theses are the main events the charity puts on to help develop skills of citizenship participation.

===== Regional Selection Conferences (RSC) =====
These are sessions organised in local areas, these are generally smaller and select delegates to progress to a National Selection Conference. They can vary in length from 3 to 8 days. However, notably, in the United Kingdom the vast majority of regional sessions are only one day and more similar in format to a Small Scale Session. Selection can take place at these conferences.

===== National Selection Conferences (NSC) =====
These sessions typically take delegates selected from RSCs and gathers them in one session. These sessions can vary from anywhere between 4 and 8 days. They are typically more upscale and prestigious than a country's regional sessions. Some sessions also field for individual delegates. The National Committee of the United Kingdom is an outlier in that they have two National Sessions.

===== International Sessions (IS) =====
International Sessions are often referred to as the EYP's flagship sessions. They are the most prestigious events that the network runs. They are hosted by a country but unlike the others involve help from the International Office and Delegates from a range of other countries that have been chosen from there NSC.

Each international session starts with a two-day Teambuilding part. This is followed by four or five days for Committee Work. A member of the European Parliament or some alternative expert will generally visit once to answer questions and quickly discuss the topic with the Committee.

As of Summer 2025, 103 international EYP sessions have taken place (taking into account the Extraordinary International Session of EYP in Lillehammer, Norway, Winter 2010).

Past international sessions plotted on a map

Past International Sessions include:

- 1st International Session in Fontainebleau, France, 1988
- 2nd International Session in Fontainebleau, France, 1989
- 3rd International Session in Thessaloniki, Greece, 1989
- 4th International Session in Fontainebleau, France, 1990
- 5th International Session in Lisbon, Portugal, 1990
- 6th International Session in Kronberg, Germany, 1990
- 7th International Session in Prague, Czechoslovakia, 1991
- 8th International Session in Barcelona, Spain, 1991
- 9th International Session in Oxford, United Kingdom, 1992
- 10th International Session in Strasbourg, France, 1992
- 11th International Session in Ghent, Belgium, 1992
- 12th International Session in Budapest, Hungary, 1993
- 13th International Session in Luxembourg, Luxembourg, 1993
- 14th International Session in Fontainebleau, France, 1993
- 15th International Session in Berlin, Germany, 1994
- 16th International Session in Brussels, Belgium, 1994
- 17th International Session in Holstebro, Denmark, 1994
- 18th International Session in Gothenburg, Sweden, 1995
- 19th International Session in Dublin, Ireland, 1995
- 20th International Session in Milan, Italy, 1995
- 21st International Session in Helsinki, Finland, 1996
- 22nd International Session in Munich, Germany, 1996
- 23rd International Session in Nicosia, Cyprus, 1996
- 24th International Session in Thessaloniki, Greece, 1997
- 25th International Session in Barcelona, Spain, 1997
- 26th International Session in Edinburgh, United Kingdom, 1997
- 27th International Session in Granada, Spain, 1998
- 28th International Session in Brussels, Belgium, 1998
- 29th International Session in Vienna, Austria, 1998
- 30th International Session in Rome, Italy, 1999
- 31st International Session in Weimar, Germany, 1999
- 32nd International Session in Hämeenlinna, Finland, 1999
- 33rd International Session in Athens, Greece, 2000
- 34th International Session in Bern, Switzerland, 2000
- 35th International Session in Oxford, United Kingdom, 2000
- 36th International Session in Stockholm, Sweden, 2001
- 37th International Session in Dubrovnik, Croatia, 2001
- 38th International Session in Porto, Portugal, 2001
- 39th International Session in Riga, Latvia, 2002
- 40th International Session in Ghent, Belgium, 2002
- 41st International Session in Turin, Italy, 2002
- 42nd International Session in Prague, Czechia, 2003
- 43rd International Session in Dublin, Ireland, 2003
- 44th International Session in Tallinn, Estonia, 2003
- 45th International Session in Durham, United Kingdom, 2004
- 46th International Session in Tábor, Czechia, 2004
- 47th International Session in Berlin, Germany, 2004
- 48th International Session in Stavanger, Norway, Spring 2005
- 49th International Session in Basel, Switzerland, Summer 2005
- 50th International Session in Bari, Italy, Autumn 2005
- 51st International Session in Paris, France, Spring 2006
- 52nd International Session in Ventspils-Riga, Latvia, Summer 2006
- 53rd International Session in Kyiv, Ukraine, Autumn 2006
- 54th International Session in Potsdam, Germany, Spring 2007
- 55th International Session in Białystok, Poland, Summer 2007
- 56th International Session in Dublin, Ireland, Autumn 2007
- 57th International Session in Prague, Czechia Spring 2008
- 58th International Session in Liverpool, United Kingdom, Summer 2008
- 59th International Session in Rennes, France, Autumn 2008
- 60th International Session in Stockholm, Sweden, Spring 2009
- 61st International Session in Leuven, Belgium, Summer 2009
- 62nd International Session in Helsinki, Finland, Autumn 2009
- 63rd International Session in Tromsø, Norway, Spring 2010
- 64th International Session in Frankfurt, Germany, Summer 2010
- 65th International Session in Lviv, Ukraine, Autumn 2010
- Extraordinary International Session in Lillehammer, Norway, Winter 2010
- 66th International Session in Athens, Greece, Spring 2011
- 67th International Session in Grenoble, France, Summer 2011
- 68th International Session in Zagreb, Croatia, Autumn 2011
- 69th International Session in Istanbul, Turkey, Spring 2012
- 70th International Session in Tallinn, Estonia, Summer 2012
- 71st International Session in Amsterdam, The Netherlands, Autumn 2012
- 72nd International Session in Munich, Germany, Spring 2013
- 73rd International Session in Zürich, Switzerland, Summer 2013
- 74th International Session in Tbilisi, Georgia, Autumn 2013
- 75th International Session in Riga, Latvia, Spring 2014
- 76th International Session in Barcelona, Spain, Summer 2014
- 77th International Session in Kyiv, Ukraine, Autumn 2014 (cancelled due to political instability)
- 78th International Session in İzmir, Turkey, Spring 2015
- 79th International Session in Tampere, Finland, Summer 2015
- 80th International Session in Leipzig, Germany, Autumn 2015
- 81st International Session in Dublin, Ireland and Belfast, United Kingdom, Spring 2016
- 82nd International Session in Rennes, France, Summer 2016
- 83rd International Session in Laax, Switzerland, Autumn 2016
- 84th International Session in Trondheim, Norway, Spring 2017
- 85th International Session in Brno, Czechia, Summer 2017
- 86th International Session in Tbilisi, Georgia, Autumn 2017
- 87th International Session in Vilnius, Lithuania, Summer 2018
- 88th International Session in Rotterdam, The Netherlands, Autumn 2018
- 89th International Session in Yerevan, Armenia, Spring 2019
- 90th International Session in Valencia, Spain, Summer 2019
- 91st International Session in Hamburg, Germany, Autumn 2019
- 92nd International Session in Milan, Italy, Spring 2021 (planned for Spring 2020, but due to Covid postponed to 2021)
- 93rd International Session in Warsaw, Poland, Summer 2021
- 94th International Session in Ljubljana, Slovenia, Summer 2021
- 95th International Session in Novi Sad, Serbia, Spring 2022
- 96th International Session in Riga, Latvia, Summer 2022
- 97th International Session in Kortrijk, Belgium, Autumn 2022
- 98th International Session in Tromsø, Norway, Spring 2023
- 99th International Session in Baku, Azerbaijan, Summer 2023
- 100th International Session in Thessaloniki, Greece, Summer 2024
- 101st International Session in The Hague, The Netherlands, Spring 2025
- 102nd International Session in Turku, Finland, Summer 2025
- 103rd International Session in Málaga, Spain, Autumn 2025
- 104th International Session in Pordenone (Friuli-Venezia Giulia), Italy, Spring 2026
- 105th International Session in Niš & Novi Sad, Serbia, Summer 2026

Future sessions will include:

- 106th International Session in Frankfurt am Main, Germany, Summer 2027
- 107th International Session in Porto, Portugal, Autumn 2027.

==== Other ====
===== Training Events =====
Usually taking place internally, training events help members to develop there skills to become better Officials at Sessions. Theses are usually more casual and involve modules by more senior Officials. Theses can be called Member Training Weekends (MTW) or Training Academies.

==== International Forums (IF) ====
International Forums typically model themselves after an International Session, focusing on fielding delegates from abroad as well as their host country; however, they receive limited funding from the International Office. These are typically six to eight days long.

=== Structure ===
==== Sessions ====
There are a number of general components that make up multi-day sessions. The exact length of each of the sections can vary according to the session type and organising National Committee. For One day sessions only the General Assembly is put on.

===== Chairpersons, Media, Organisers, and Jury (CMOJ) Day =====
On this day facilitators, or officials, of the event come together to engage in a short programme of team building activities then followed by a longer section of modules, delivered by more experienced facilitators to their juniors.

===== Team building (TB) =====
This is generally the day which delegates arrive to the session. The entire group of officials and delegates then typically come together to engage in 'general teambuilding' where officials are introduced to the delegates and large group games are played. The delegates are then split off into their committees and begin to get acquainted with each other. The delegates play different games which are meant to bring the delegates from an initial shyness stage to a comfortable, open atmosphere optimal for efficient Committee work.

===== Committee Work (CW) =====
During this time the delegates discuss a problematic topic on current European political matters and write a resolution on how to deal with the issue. These resolutions are modelled after real life examples from the European Parliament, however, they may be simplified. At certain events delegates may also engage in a workshop, talk or seminar with experts from the field during this phase.

===== General Assembly (GA) =====
This is the time in which committee resolutions are debated on by the delegates. Exact debate procedure can vary slightly and amendments may or may not be allowed. Delegates can generally vote for, against or to abstain.

===== Selection =====
Jury Members at the end of a session after will select delegates that have performed the best to be delegates in another session above the one they are in.

==== Training ====
Theses events usually involve Trainers putting on modules to help educate other junior members. Other than this there may be some social or teambuilding modules dependant on the NC.

== See also ==
- European Youth Parliament – Armenia
- European Youth Parliament - Ireland
- European Youth Parliament – The Netherlands
- European Youth Parliament – Ukraine
- European Youth Parliament – Finland
