= Sangguniang Kabataan =

Local youth councils in the Philippines

- 10th Council

Type
- Type: Unicameral

History
- Founded: 1975
- Preceded by: Kabataang Barangay

Leadership
- National Representative: Carol Julianne "CJ" Dalipe
- Seats: 41,995 chairpersons 293,965 councilors

Elections
- Voting system: Direct election
- Last election: October 30, 2023
- Next election: November 13, 2028

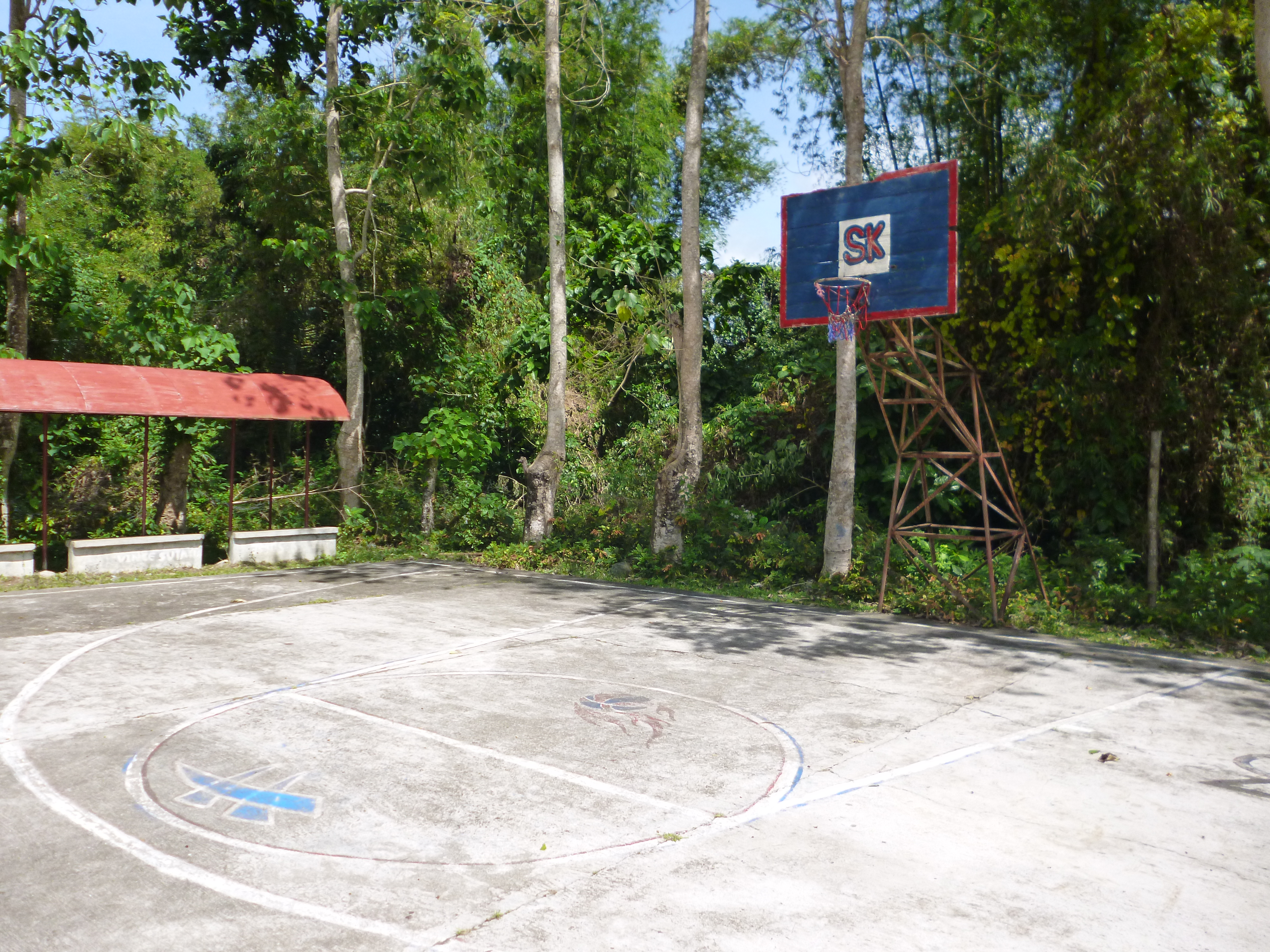
Basketball hoop with SK logo in Barangay Tungay, Santa Barbara, Iloilo

A Sangguniang Kabataan (SK; lit. 'youth council') is a community council that represents the youth in a barangay in the Philippines. Established to provide young people with a platform for civic engagement and participation in local governance, the SK is composed of elected officials aged 18 to 24, including a chairperson and several councilors. Its primary mandate is to initiate, plan, and implement programs, projects, and activities that promote the welfare and development of youth within the barangay.

Under the Sangguniang Kabataan Reform Act of 2015, or Republic Act No. 10742, the age requirement for SK officials was raised from 15 to 17 years old to 18–24 years old to ensure legal accountability and capacity to enter into contracts. Despite this change, the age range for eligible SK voters remains 15–30 years old. The SK is allotted 10 percent of the barangay's annual budget, which is earmarked exclusively for youth development initiatives. These may include leadership training, health services, education programs, livelihood training, and activities promoting civic consciousness and national identity.

The SK has undergone significant reforms to address concerns over political patronage and inefficiency. Notably, its operations were temporarily suspended following the passage of Republic Act No. 10632, which postponed SK elections to allow time for institutional reforms. During this period, barangays were instructed to utilize the SK funds through youth development committees and interim task forces. Despite the suspension of elections, government agencies emphasized that the SK had not been abolished, and youth-oriented programs were expected to continue at the barangay level.

A chairperson leads the Sangguniang Kabataan. A local youth development council composed of representatives from different local youth groups supports the SK and its programs.

The Sangguniang Kabataan is the successor of the Kabataang Barangay (KB; lit. 'village youth'), which was abolished by the Local Government Code of 1991. The author, Senator Nene Pimentel, abolished it because of allegations against the organization.

== Function and structure ==
Each barangay houses a Sangguniang Kabataan (SK) composed of a chairperson, seven members, a secretary, and a treasurer. The Kagawads, or councilors, approved resolutions and appropriate money allotted to the council. The chairperson automatically sits on the barangay council as an ex officio member and is automatically chairman of the Committee on Youth and Sports, one of the standing committees of the barangay council.

The council represents youth who have resided in their barangay for at least one year and registered to vote. It leads the local youth programs.

Members of the SK are paid for serving on the council. Under the Local Government Code, only the SK chairperson receives an honorarium but in some areas the practice is that the chairman shares his payment with other members of the SK council. In one barangay, each SK member received ₱500 per month from the chairman.

=== Local Youth Development Council ===
Under the 2015 reform, a new Local Youth Development Council was formed to support SK programs and comprised representatives from different youth organizations in the community including student councils, church and youth faith groups, youth-serving organizations, and community-based youth groups.

=== SK federations ===
Every SK is a part of either a municipal or city SK federation, which are constituents of a provincial SK federation. The SK chairperson of a barangay represents their barangay within the municipal or city association. The presidents of these city and municipal federations, in a similar manner, become members of the provincial or metropolitan associations, each of which has its own elected president as well. The presidents of independent cities' and provinces' associations compose the membership in the national association and elect the national president who automatically sits on the National Youth Commission.

== History ==
=== Predecessors ===
The SK developed out of the Kabataang Barangay, which was established during martial law by President Ferdinand Marcos. Marcos established the KB on April 15, 1975, by virtue of Presidential Decree 684 to give youth a chance to be involved in community affairs and to provide the government means to inform youth of the government's development efforts. His daughter Imee was the first chairperson.

Controversy surrounded the KB, including the enforcement of authoritarian rule among youth, opposition to militant youth activity, and its failure to develop youth as a responsive collective. The KB grew less popular among youth, and student activism became the trend in youth participation nationwide. In June 1986, a study was conducted on the KB and recommended abolishing the organization, creating a National Youth Commission (NYC), establishing a National Youth Assembly; and setting up genuine youth representation in government. Youth were consulted and the KB was abolished by the government. However, then-president Corazon Aquino had already established the Presidential Council for Youth Affairs (PCYA) instead of the NYC, and was successful in coordinating with the youth federations to develop future national leaders, but lacked the powers envisioned for the NYC because PCYA merely coordinated with youth groups. A proposal was then crafted by the Congress youth representatives and PCYA's technical committee from 1989 to 1990.

The proposal that created the Katipunan ng Kabataan (KK) and SK was incorporated into the 1991 Local Government Code (known as Local Autonomy Act or Republic Act No. 7160), which formally abolished the KB and created the KK and SK. The KK includes all Filipino citizens, age 10 to 18 years, who reside in each barangay for at least six months and are registered in the official barangay list. The SK is the governing body of the KK, a set of youth leaders elected by the KK members to represent them and deliver youth-focused services in the barangay.

The age range of the youth eligible for the KK and SK was reduced to 15 from below 18 due to the changes by Republic Act No. 9164, which amended the Local Autonomy Act in 2002.

=== Sangguniang Kabataan reform ===
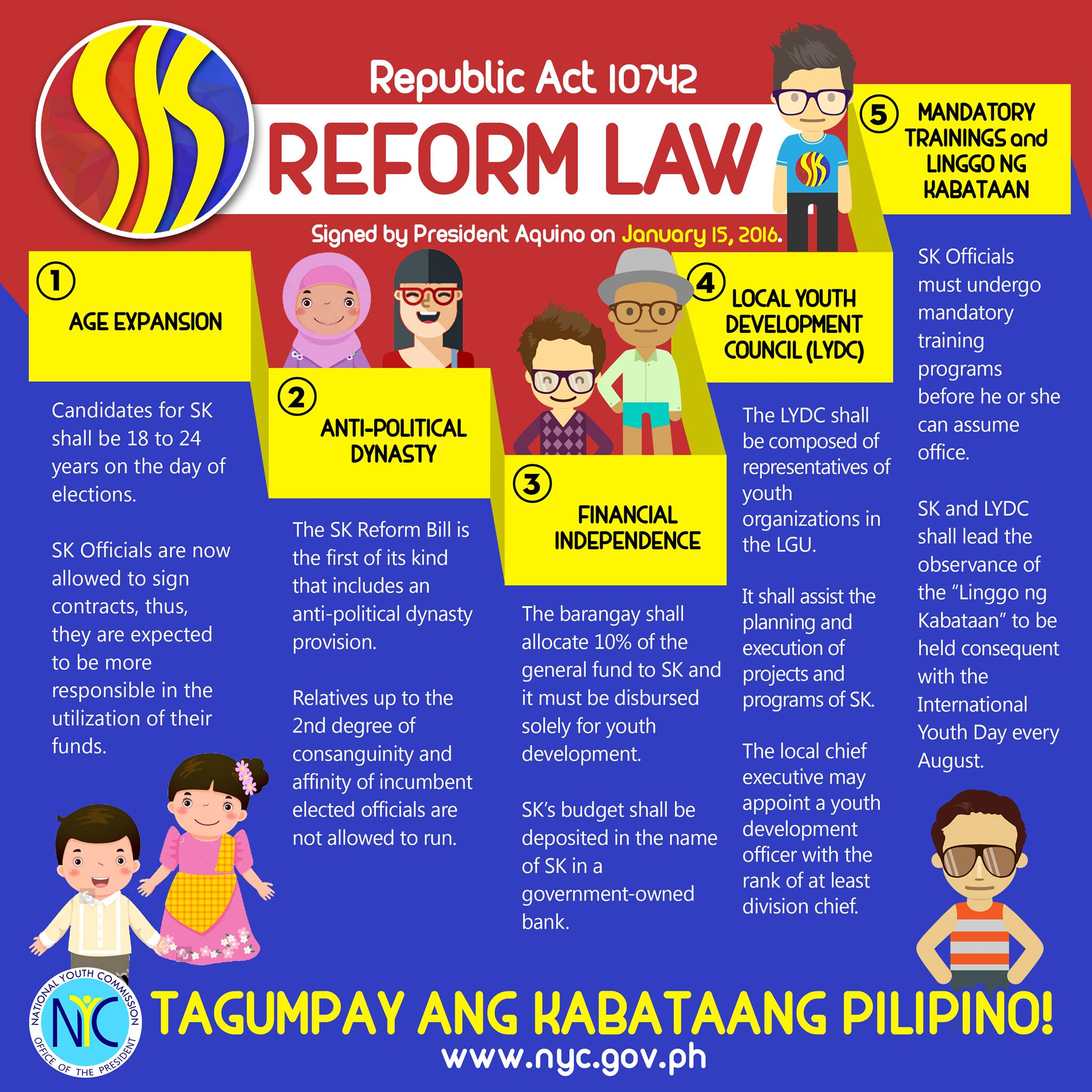
Infographic from the National Youth Council of the changes made by the Sangguniang Kabataan Reform Act.

SKs developed a poor reputation. One youth advocate said he was dissuaded from running for an SK because "Aside from the lack of concrete legislative and youth development programs, I have heard of certain issues raised against the SK like corruption, nepotism, and recurring programs focusing on sports festivals and pageantry only." A 2007 study by UNICEF and the Department of the Interior and Local Government said, "The SK's performance for the past ten years has been generally weak. This is especially true in terms of coming up with legislations, promoting the development of young people, submitting reports and holding consultations with their constituents."

Because of concerns that SKs are "breeding ground[s] for political dynasty and exposing the youth to corruption and the practice of traditional politicians" known colloquially as trapos, Republic Act No. 10632 was enacted in 2013 to postpone the scheduled October 2013 SK elections until some time between October 28, 2014, and February 23, 2015, and leave all SK positions vacant until new officers are elected, and explicitly prohibits the appointing of officials to fill said vacant positions. Senator Francis Escudero said the vacancies would technically abolish the SK. During this time, the Commission on Elections and the Department of the Interior and Local Government issued regulations on how the barangays are to use the 10% of Internal Revenue Allotment set aside for SK activities and mandated the creation in each barangay of a "Task Force on Youth Development". In the place of SKs, ad hoc youth committees were formed.

In January 2015, the Philippine House of Representatives unanimously passed a reform bill. Among the reforms are raising the age of SK officials from between 15 and 17 years old to between 18 and 21, raising the age of voters from between 15 and 17 to between 15 and 21, an anti-dynasty provision that forbids candidates from having a relative in public office that is within the second degree of cosanguinity, and provisions to increase SKs' fiscal autonomy. Immediately after passing the reform bill, the Philippine House passed a bill further postponing the SK elections from February 2015 to October 2016 to be held at the same time as the barangay elections of 2016. In March 2015, a law postponing the elections to 2016 was signed by President Aquino, but the elections were eventually held in May 2018.

On January 15, 2016, the Sangguniang Kabataan Reform Act (Republic Act No. 10742) was signed into law which made changes to the SK. It raised the age of the council from 15 to 17 years old to 18 to 24 years old and forbade individuals from seeking a youth council appointment who are closer than the second degree of consanguinity from any elected or appointed official in the same area. It is the first Philippine law with an anti-political dynasty restriction for elected positions, as permitted by the 1987 Philippine Constitution. The reform also created a Local Youth Development Council to support the SK programs, composed of representatives from different youth organizations in the community including student councils, church and youth faith groups, youth-serving organizations, and community-based youth groups.

On May 6, 2022, President Rodrigo Duterte signed Republic Act No. 11768, amending certain sections of RA No. 10742, granting additional qualifications and compensation for SK members.

== See also ==
- Youth council
- Youth politics
