= Japanese Community Youth Council =

The Japanese Community Youth Council (JCYC) is a non-profit community organization dedicated to serving the children, youth and families living in the San Francisco Bay Area, California. Established in 1970, JCYC has become one of San Francisco’s most successful youth organizations. While still committed to children and youth from the Japanese American community, JCYC has evolved and grown into an organization which annually serves over 8,000 young people from all socio-economic and ethnic backgrounds.
