= Youth council =

Forum for youth and/or children to advocate

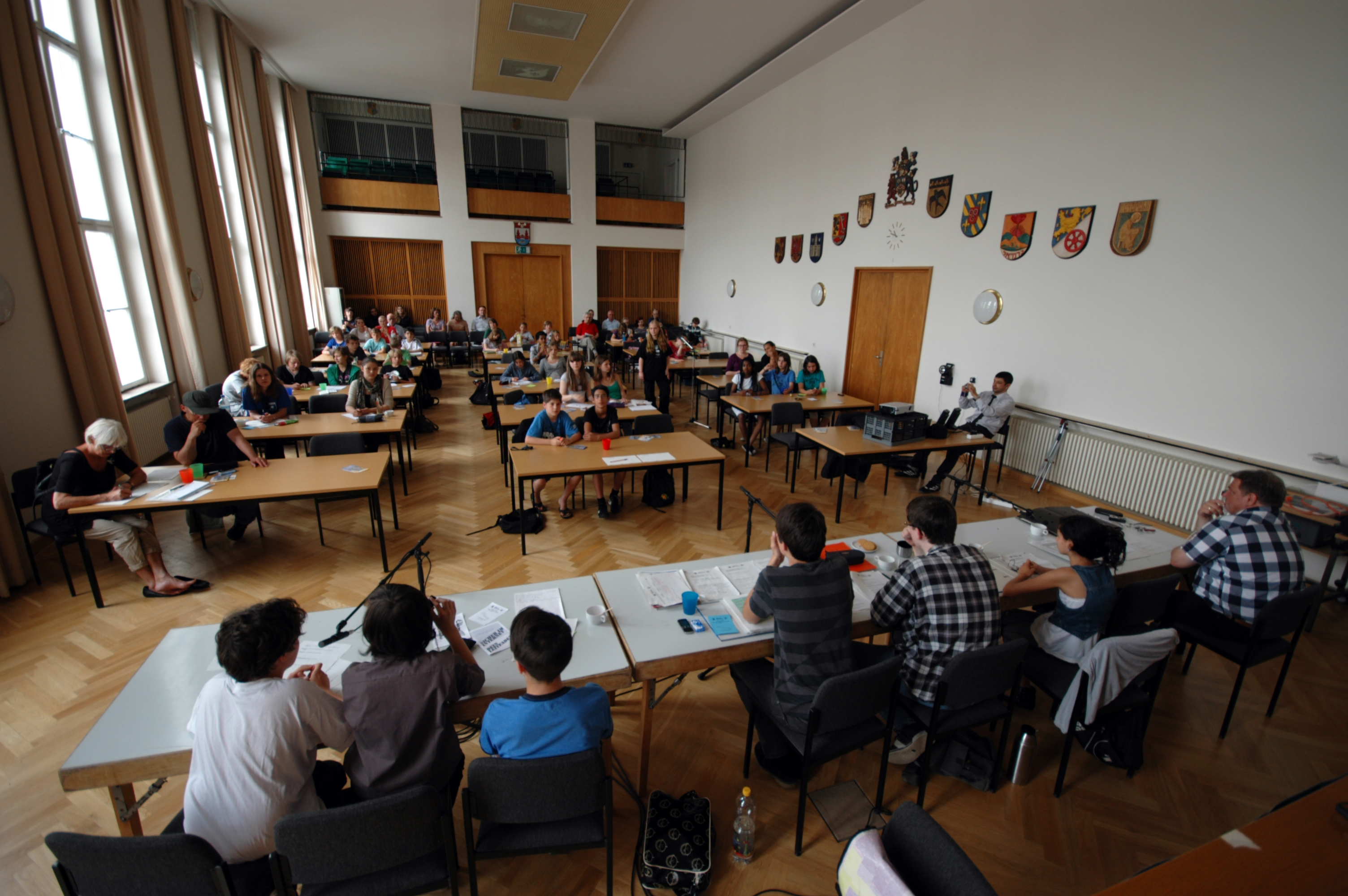
A youth parliament in Charlottenburg-Wilmersdorf, Berlin.

Youth councils, also known as youth cabinets, youth assemblies or youth parliaments, are a form of youth voice engaged in community decision-making. They are appointed or elected bodies that exist on local, state, provincial, regional, national, and international levels among governments, non governmental organisations (NGOs), schools, and other entities. Groups that include children (typically starting at age 5) often call themselves children's parliaments and are paired with youth parliaments of older children and young people.

== About ==
Youth councils have many purposes. Many are consultative bodies for more representative political bodies at all levels of government. How they are composed varies, with some youth councils being elected by young people in the community, while others are handpicked by political officials or elected by youth NGOs.

Article 12 of the United Nations' Convention on the Rights of the Child is also widely credited with promoting youth councils. Youth councils have also seen growth in Western Europe with help from the European Youth Forum, and in the United States and Canada thanks to groups such as The Freechild Project and Points of Light Foundation.

== Examples of youth councils ==
=== Africa ===
The National Youth Council of Nigeria was formed in 1964.

=== Asia ===
In India, the Youth Parliament Program is the main national youth parliament under the leadership of Raghavendar Askani, Dr. Jayaprakash Narayan, where youth can come together, think, discuss and debate on various issues such as Education and Health, Electoral and Political Reforms, Judicial & Police Reforms, Local Governments & Citizen-centered governance, Governance Reforms, Instruments of Accountability, and Public Policy Reforms of India.

In Israel there is a National Youth Council whose members are elected from 7 Regional Youth Councils, which are elected from Municipal councils, formed from representatives of School Student Councils and Youth Movements.

In Malaysia, the Youth Parliament of Malaysia is the main national youth parliament under supervisions by Parliament of Malaysia. The Youth Parliament has members of the Youth Parliament elected by registered voters between 15 and 40 ages. Any citizen not less than 18 years of age and not older than 30 years of age can become a candidate and be elected to the Youth Parliament.

In the Philippines, the Sangguniang Kabataan, formerly known as Kabataang Barangay (KB), is the main national youth council. It has a chairman and members of the council who are elected by registered voters in each barangay. Each chairman are entitled to become part as members of the Federation which will serve as member (ex-officio) in the local legislative bodies except for the National Federation. It has indirect supervision by NYC Philippines. Under the 2016 reform, a new Local Youth Development Council was formed to support the SK programs and to be composed of representatives from different youth organisations in the community including student councils, church and youth faith groups, youth-serving organisations, and community-based youth groups. "The LYDC aims to harmonize, broaden and strengthen all programs and initiatives of the local government and non-governmental organisations for the youth sector," said Senator Bam Aquino, then chairman of the Senate Committee on Youth and co-author of the reform act.

In South Korea, the National Youth Council(청소년특별회의) is a pan-governmental youth policy organization established under the "Basic Youth Act" and supported by the Ministry of Gender Equality and Family. It is installed in the central and all metropolitan local governments like province and metropolitan city, and youths aged 9 to 25 are selected and operated on a yearly basis, by government(s). The developed policy is directly transmitted to the executive branch and accepted or rejected. Currently, there are about 70 people in the center and 430 people in metropolitan local governments. Central Council established in 2004 by the presidential pledge, takes a form closer to a policy advisory body belonging to the government. On the other hand, such youth participation organizations are established in the form of "Youth Council" or "Youth Participation Committee" in local governments at the basic level like city, county, autonomous district; as a legally mandated matter also.

=== Europe ===
In Europe there is a consolidated tradition of representative youth platforms at pan-regional, national, and local levels. At European level, the European Youth Forum constitutes the platforms which gathers more than 93 National Youth Council and International Non-Governmental youth organisations. It is a non-governmental structure which serves its members and applies the principles of democratic representation and transparency through its internal democratic system (election of the board and the president). At the institutional level, the Council of Europe has a specific co-managed system to run its youth sector. Governmental and non-Governmental representative co-decide upon the priorities of the youth program of the institution and they also co-manage activities which are run in two youth centres in Strasbourg and Budapest. The Youth Constituency is called "Advisory Council on Youth" (AC) beside the co-decision mechanism internal to the Directorate for Youth and Sport has the possibility to advise the Institution on any matter which affect young people and which is tackled by Council of Europe.

At national level there are National Youth Councils many of which have similar structures to the European Youth Forum. For over a decade, the UK's British Youth Council had operated the UK Youth Parliament. Notable for being the only other organisation able to meet in the House of Commons, all young people between the ages of 11 and 18 can vote for their local Member of Youth Parliament. Additionally, the Council also operated the UK Young Mayor's Network, NHS Youth Forum and the House of Commons' Youth Select Committee. The British Youth Council dissolved in 2024.

Often there are regional and local council which adopts various kind of constituencies and organisations case by case. An example of this is the Scottish Youth Parliament. Some youth councils are for each constituency such as the Dartford Youth Council in the United Kingdom. Another example is the PAL-TIN, which is a national alliance of local youth councils in Romania. Additionally, some youth councils, for example the Greek Youth Parliament allows for the participation not only of youth from within the country, but also from countries with large Greek communities such as Germany and Australia. Among 1800 local youth and children's councils exist in France. 500 of these are members of an umbrella organisation created in 1991 called Anacej (National Association of Youth and Children Councils).

In Germany they have Youth and parliament (Jugend und Parlament) at the Bundestag.

=== North America ===
In the United States and Canada, youth councils have been formed by non-profit organisations and at all levels of government. Many cities, including Boston, Los Angeles, San Francisco, Chicago, Miami, Houston, Dallas, Seattle, and San Jose, California, have active youth councils that inform city government decision-making. For instance, the Los Angeles Youth Council is sponsored by the Commission for Children Youth and their Families. Prior to being established as a program of this commission, it was operated as Mayor Tom Bradley's Youth Advisory Board. This Youth Council is currently working on creating a citywide Youth Policy. Several state-level government agencies and legislatures have created youth councils, including Washington, Minnesota, Maine, Arizona, Iowa, Indiana, Louisiana, New Mexico, Massachusetts, and New Hampshire. Maine's council was the first statewide youth council created in the US, and the others were created soon after that.

In the United States there are several forms of youth councils. They include youth advisory councils, which provide input and feedback regarding adult-driven decision-making; youth research councils that are responsible for assessment and evaluation of youth and community programs, and; youth action councils which are designed to either be youth/adult partnerships or youth-led activities that are youth-driven and generally, youth-focused. A new breed of Youth Council also exists that include a perspective on "leadership", which is not always interpreted in the same way from one generation to the next. This form of Youth Council embraces all of the above-mentioned qualities; advisory, assessment & evaluation skills & the importance of partnering etc., as well as the traditional consideration of gaining access to what timeless knowledge that may still be of value and, in theory, the effect of "the path of leadership on our current leaders" and what kind of examples there are to study (if any) and capitalize/maximize of what is worthy and ongoing. As in all generations, Youth have the same responsibilities/concerns in: learning to work together, creating stability/sustainability, a future for their children etc. This generation's challenges will need all the skills of leadership on top of returning to what it is to be a true Human Being.

=== Oceania ===
In New Zealand, some city council local boards have set up youth equivalents, an example being Howick Youth Council in Howick, Auckland.

=== South America ===
In Córdoba, Argentina, since the year 2013 exists the Alumni Youth Council. It was created by a group of Alumni of the English Access Micro-scholarship Program, and it is a non-profit and pluralistic organization of young volunteers that promotes education and youth participation in society, and that works for human development.

== See also ==
- List of youth councils
- List of youth parliaments
- Student voice
- Youth suffrage
- Youth voice
