= Tampere University of Technology =

Former university in Tampere, Finland

- Tampereen teknillinen yliopisto
- Former names: Tampereen teknillinen korkeakoulu, also translated as Tampere University of Technology
- Motto: Technology for the Benefit of People and the Environment
- Type: Public Foundation
- Active: 1965–2018
- Affiliations: ECIU, EUA, SEFI, MCA
- Budget: Approx. €147 million (2013)
- Rector: Jaakko Puhakka
- Administrative staff: 1,463 (2013)
- Students: 9,904 (2013)
- Undergraduates: 8,449 (2013)
- Doctoral students: 1,455 (2013)
- Location: Tampere, Finland; 61°26′58″N 023°51′36″E
- Campus: Urban
- Colours: Green, Blue and Grey
- Website: www.tut.fi

Tampere University of Technology (TUT) (Finnish: Tampereen teknillinen yliopisto (TTY)) was Finland's second-largest university in engineering sciences. The university was located in Hervanta, a suburb of Tampere. It was merged with the University of Tampere to create the new Tampere University on 1 January 2019.

The university's statutory duty was to pursue research and give the highest education in its field. The research, conducted by some 1,800 staff and faculty members, mostly focused on applied science and often has close ties to many different companies (such as Nokia). Located next to the university campus is a Technology Centre Hermia, including a large Nokia research facility. TUT was one of the only two Finnish universities which operate as foundation. The yearly budget of the university was some 147 million euros. Close to 50% of its budget was external funding. According to Times Higher Education, it ranked 11th in the world, and 4th in Europe, for industry collaboration.

== History ==
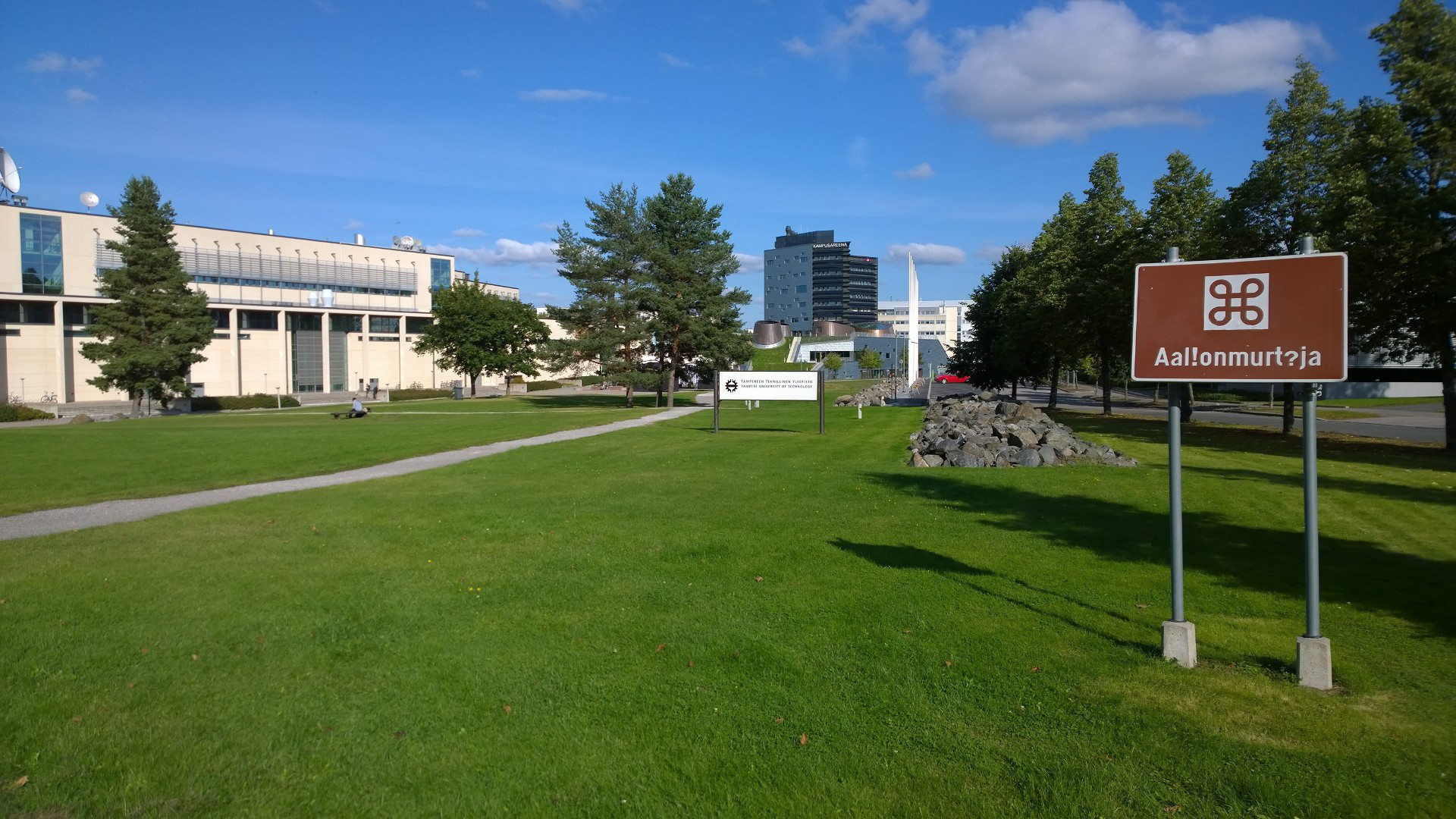
The campus of Tampere University

From the late 19th century, Tampere had been the most important industrial center in Finland. The Technical Institute of Tampere had provided engineers for its industries since 1911, but all higher technological education in Finland took place in Helsinki University of Technology. In the 1950s, the city of Tampere started actively remedying the situation, first founding a municipal science library in 1955. This library formed the core for the libraries of the TUT and the medical faculty of the University of Tampere In 1960, city succeeded in persuading the small private university Yhteiskunnallinen korkeakoulu to move to Tampere from Helsinki. A few years later, this university changed its name to University of Tampere.

The founding of the Tampere University of Technology was one of the steps of the city and the local business life in bringing higher education to the region. The university was founded in 1965 as a branch of Helsinki University of Technology and became an independent university status in 1972. The Student Union of Tampere University of Technology (Tampereen teknillisen yliopiston ylioppilaskunta, TTYY) was also established alongside the university.

In 2003, the university changed its Finnish name from TTKK (Tampereen teknillinen korkeakoulu) to TTY (Tampereen teknillinen yliopisto) so that the Finnish name would be closer to the English name and to distinguish itself from polytechnics that are not universities in the meaning of the Humboldtian university ideal or in the meaning of the Finnish law.

As a part of the Finnish university reform, Tampere University of Technology chose to become one of the two Finnish universities operating as foundations in the beginning of 2010. The university hopes that compared to the previous form of state agency, the foundation form gives it more operational freedom.

A programme, called Tampere3, to merge the university with University of Tampere and Tampere University of Applied Sciences was started in the spring of 2014. The merger was approved by Parliament in December 2017 and came into effect on 1 January 2019. The new foundation-based interdisciplinary higher education institution is named Tampere University. The new university will comprise 35,000 students and 5,000 employees, thus, being the second largest university in Finland.

== Faculties ==
Tampere University of Technology comprises five faculties:

- Faculty of Biomedical Sciences and Engineering:
  - Institute of Biosciences and Medical Technology (BioMediTech), joint institute of TUT and UTA
- Faculty of Business and Built Environment:
  - School of Architecture
  - Department of Civil Engineering
  - Department of Industrial and Information Management
  - Language Centre
  - Centre for Professional Development Edutech
- Faculty of Computing and Electrical Engineering
  - Department of Electrical Energy Engineering
  - Department of Electronics and Communications Engineering
  - Department of Pervasive Computing
  - Department of Signal Processing
- Faculty of Engineering Sciences
  - Department of Automation and Hydraulic Engineering
  - Department of Mechanical Engineering and Industrial Systems
  - Department of Materials Science
- Faculty of Natural Sciences
  - Department of Chemistry and Bioengineering
  - Department of Mathematics
  - Department Photonics
  - Department of Physics
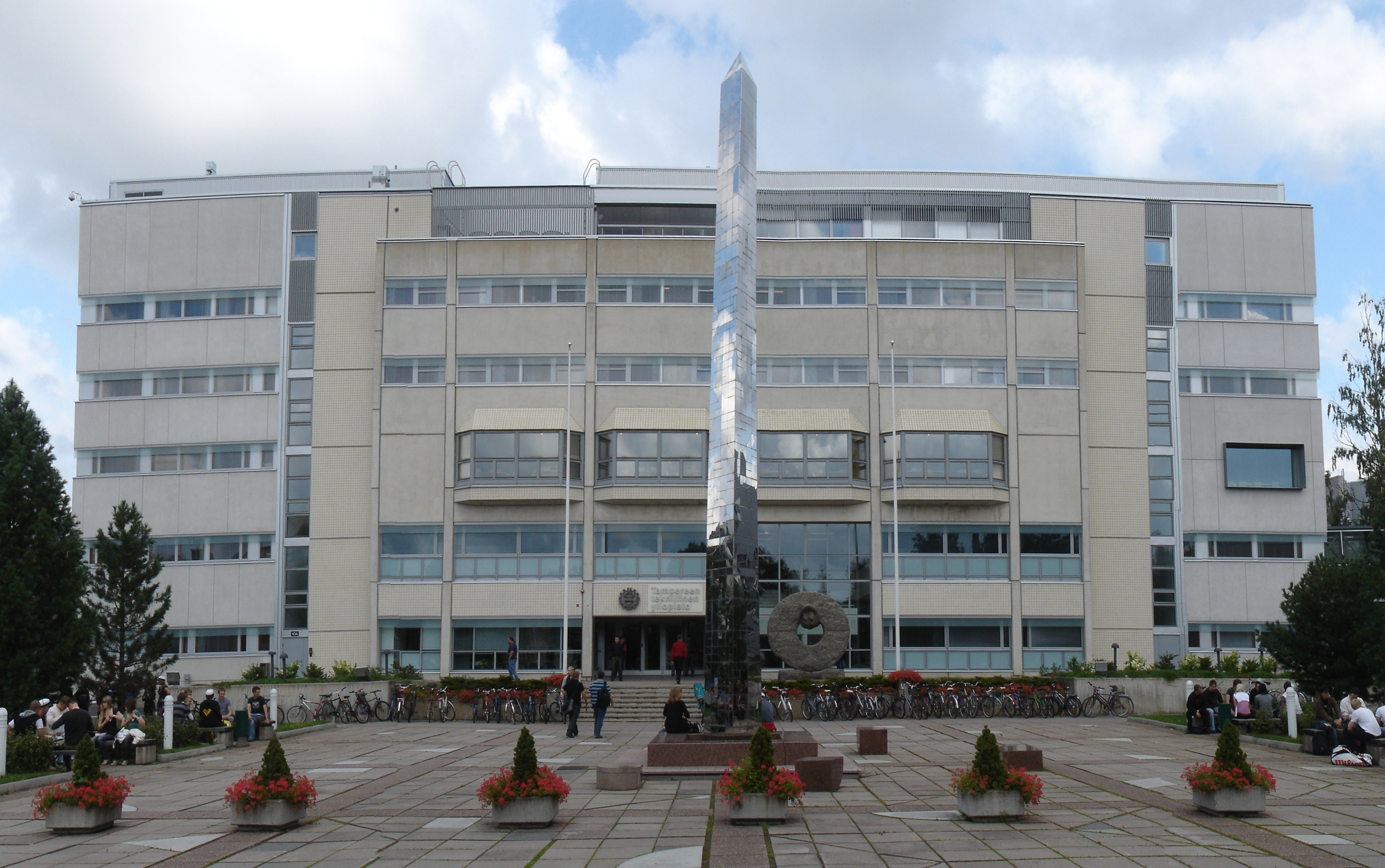
Päätalo

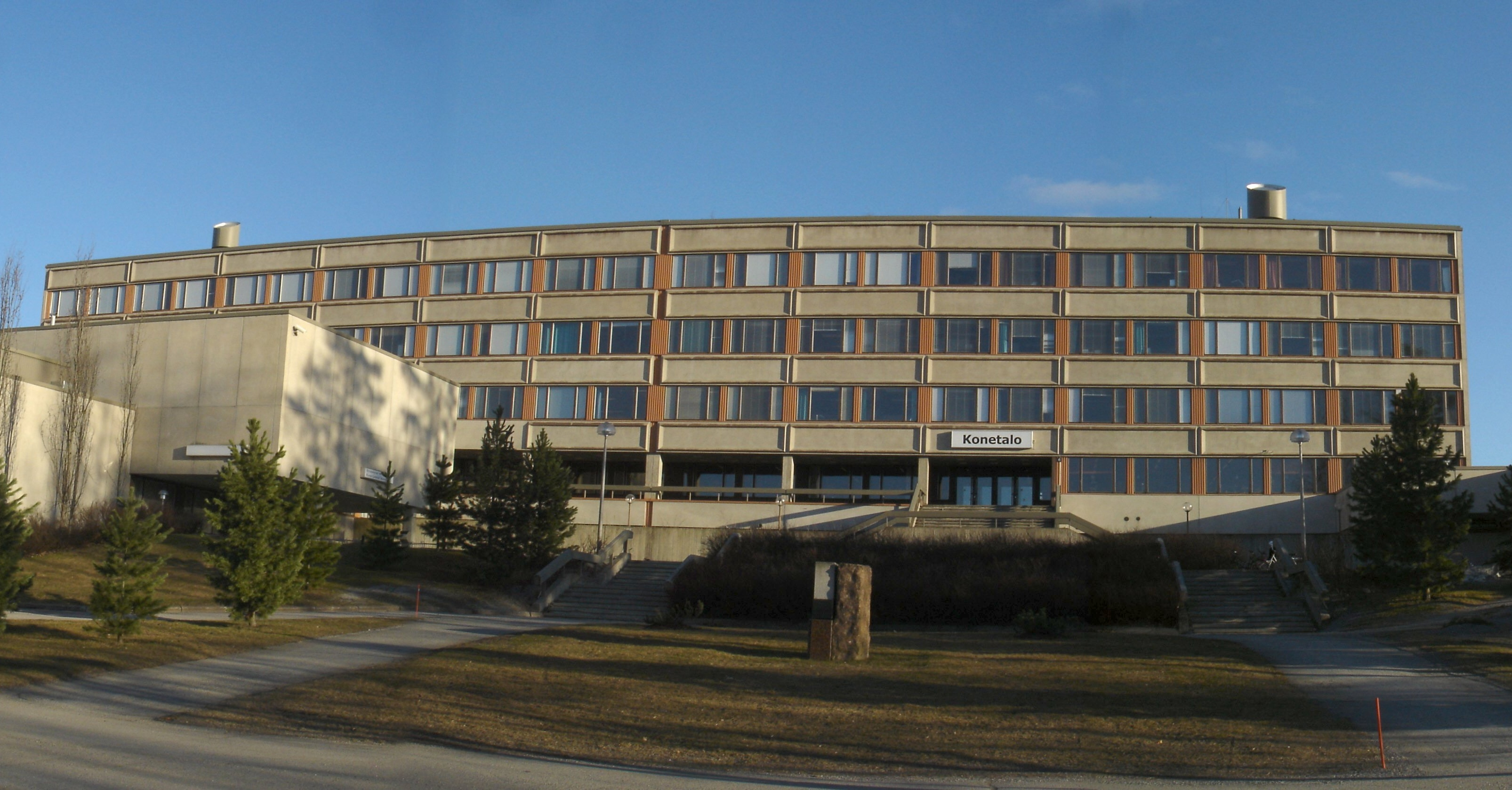
Konetalo

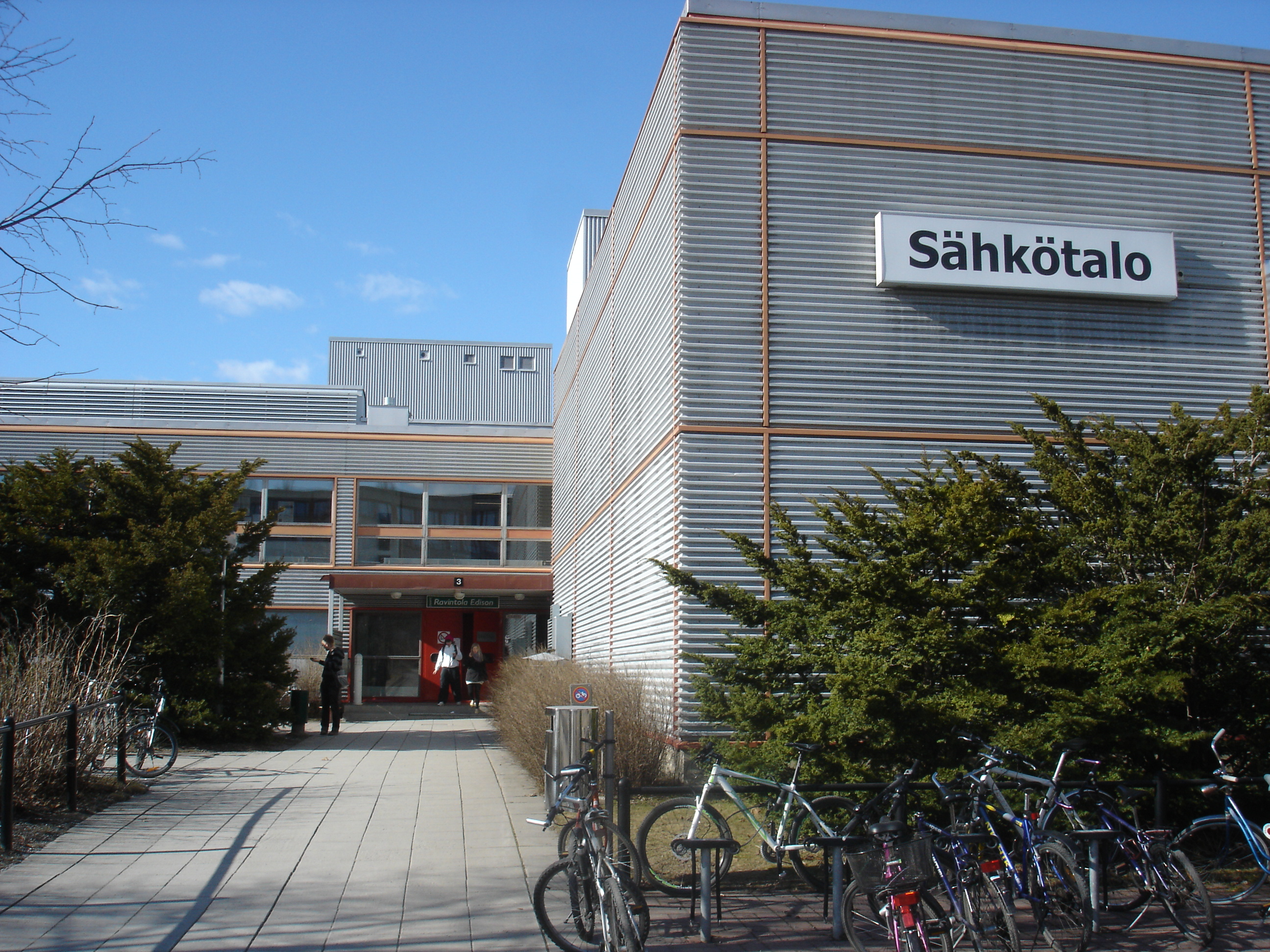
Sähkötalo

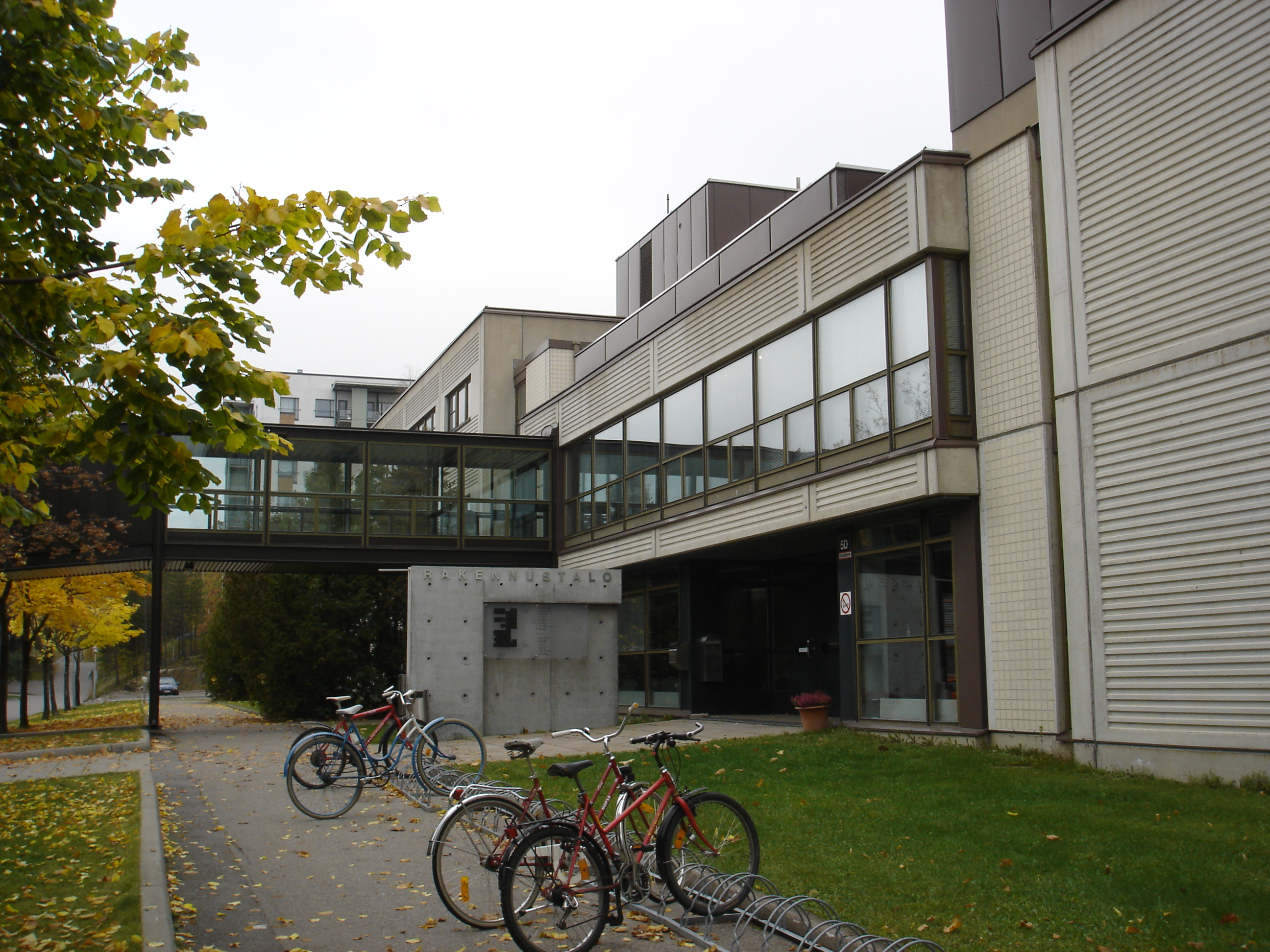
Rakennustalo

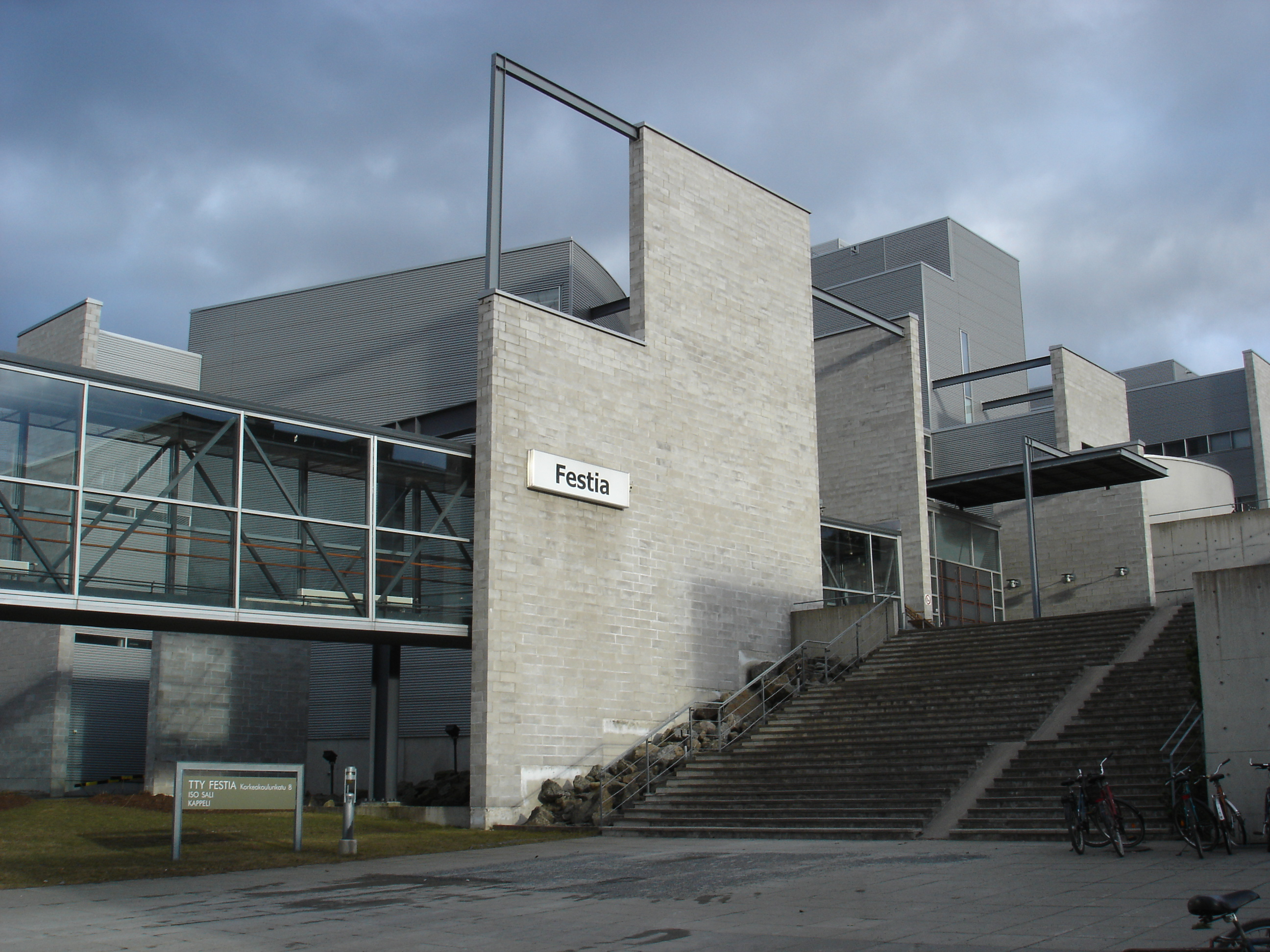
Festia

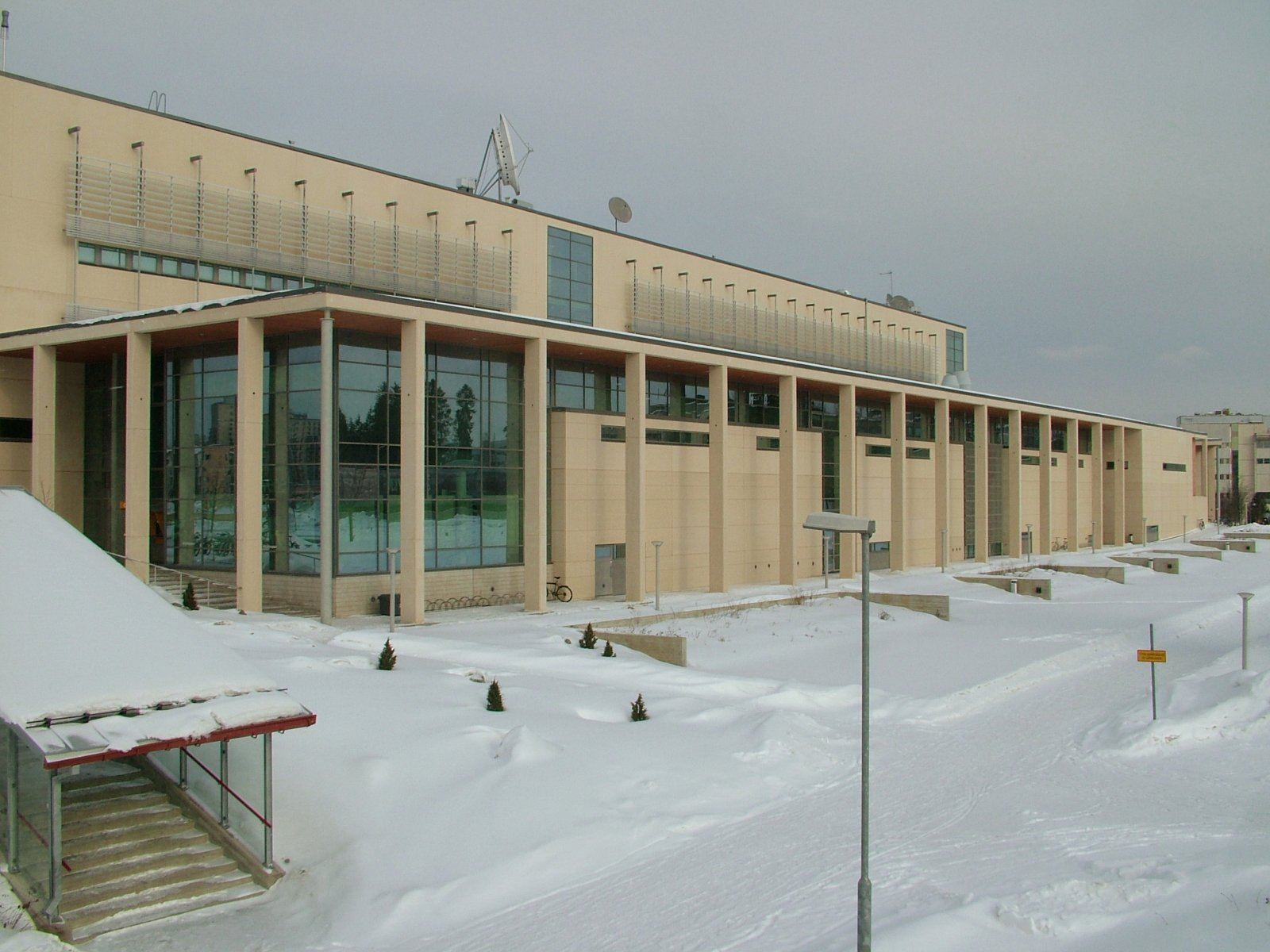
Tietotalo Southwest

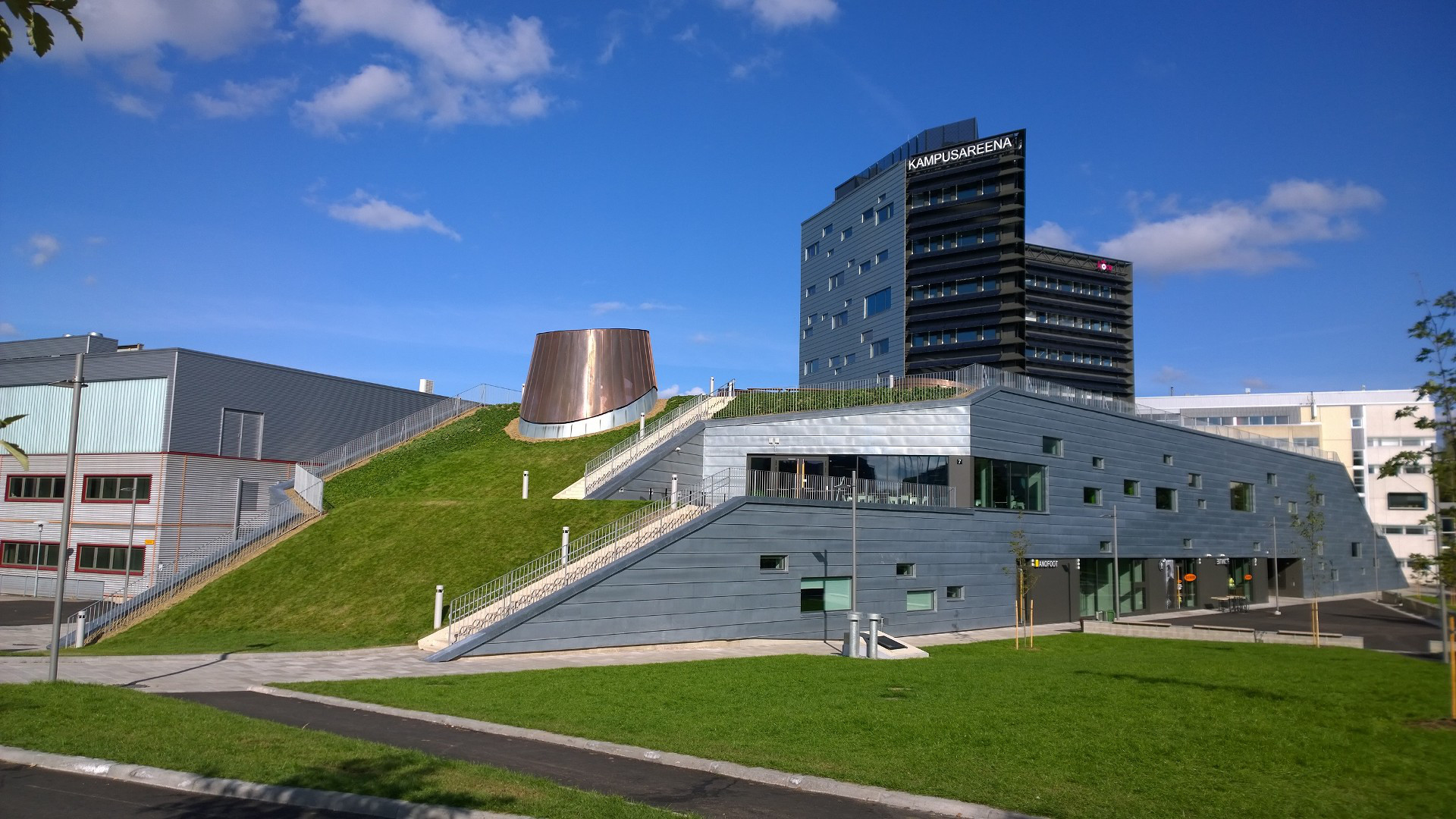
Kampusareena

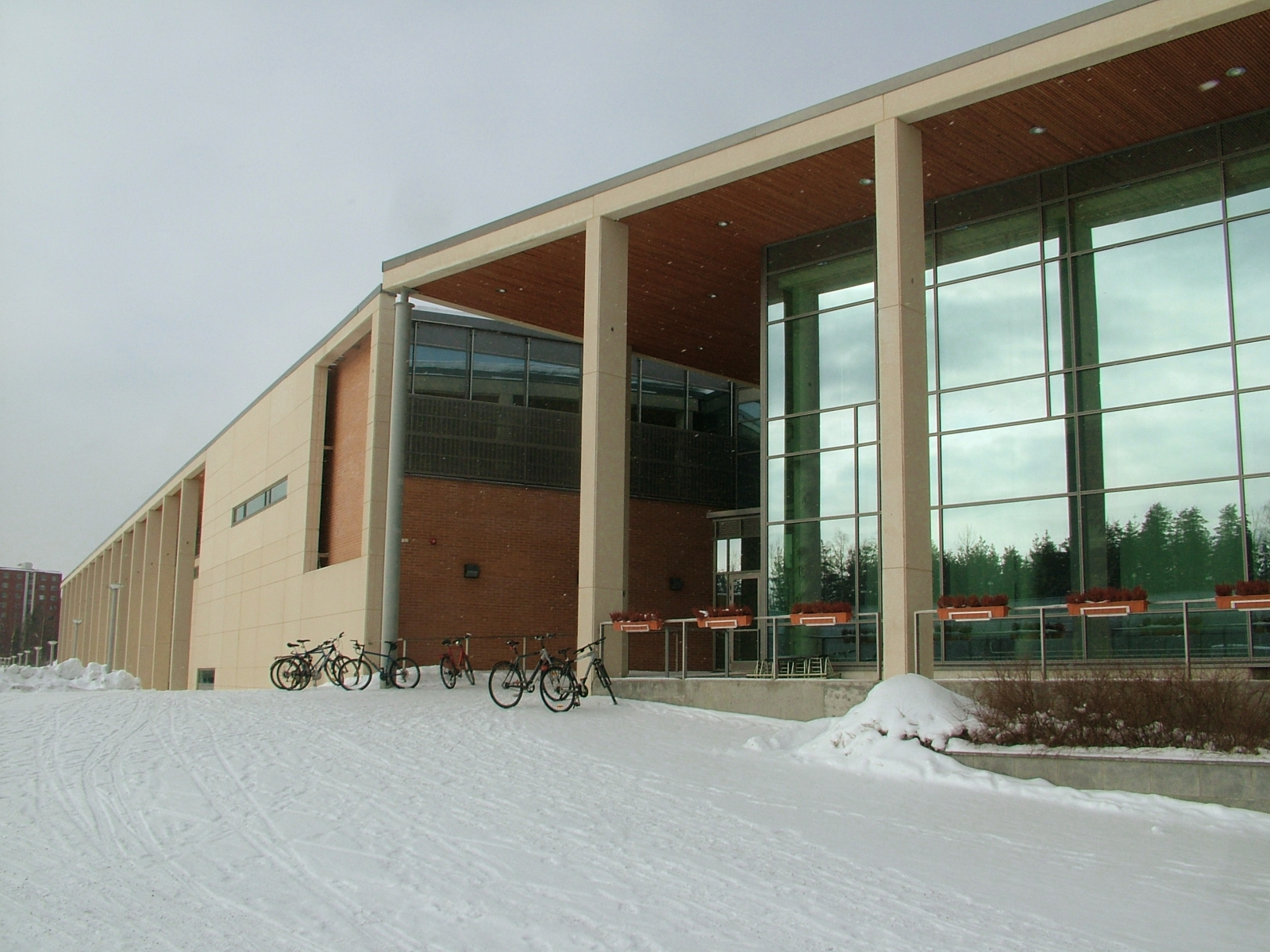
Tietotalo East

== Research ==
University rankings

Global – Overall
- CWTS World: 849
- QS World: 366
- RUR World: 265
- THE World: 401–500

Tampere University of Technology is primarily a research university, which specializes in technology and architecture. While all departments pursue scientific research and publish in international, peer-reviewed journals, the strongest areas of the university are signal processing, nanophotonics, biotechnology, and intelligent mobile hydraulic systems. The university has one Finnish Center of Excellence, the Signal Processing Laboratory. In addition, it participates in two other Finnish Centers of Excellence. Among other things, the university has been developing the world's first: biodegradable joint implant, communicator, yellow laser and walking harvester.

In 2014, the researchers of TUT published 1586 papers in peer-reviewed international publications, meaning an average of a more than one article per researcher. The university has 133 full professors, 193 tenured lecturers, and 754 researchers, of which 22% are international employees.

Tampere University of Technology has been selected three times as one of the best universities under 50 years old by Times Higher Education and QS World University Rankings has ranked it twice among the best 50 young universities in the World.

=== Research assessment 2011 ===
An international independent team made an assessment of research quality in TUT in 2011. The Assessment Scale was: Outstanding International Level (5), Very Good International Level (4), Good International Level (3), Fair International Level (2), and Poor International Level (1). When comparing the results between different faculties, the results are not comparable as the assessment was done by different group of people for different faculties. Intra-faculty comparisons however can be done based on the results. Furthermore, the numerical evaluations were accompanied with the verbal assessments, which give better understanding than the plain integer numbers. Overall, the results were mostly in the range of Very Good and Good International Level.

=== HR excellence in research ===
In recognition of development activities related to research careers and the position of researchers at the university, the European Commission awarded Tampere University of Technology the right to use the HR Excellence in Research logo in spring 2014.

The logo demonstrates that the working conditions and career opportunities of research staff at TUT comply with recommendations given by the European Commission in The European Charter for Researchers and The Code of Conduct for the Recruitment of Researchers. The Charter & Code aim to give equal rights and obligations to individual researchers throughout Europe, therefore improving mobility and working conditions as well as reinforcing research and development across Europe.

== Education ==
=== Undergraduate degree programs ===
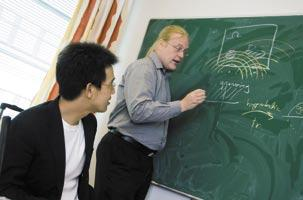
Professor Samuli Siltanen, member of the Finnish Center of Excellence in Inverse Problems, lecturing

The university awards undergraduate degrees of tekniikan kandidaatti (Bachelor of Science in Technology (B.Sc. Tech.) or Architecture (B.Sc. Arch.), diplomi-insinööri (Master of Science in Technology (M.Sc. Tech.), and arkkitehti (M.Sc. Arch.). The recommended time for the completion of master's degree is five years (3 for B.Sc. and 2 for M.Sc.) to complete. In practice, the students use little bit less than seven years for their studies, on average. However, this average includes the compulsory military service of 6–12 months that most of the male students (76% of the student body) complete before graduation. Yearly, some 800–850 masters graduate from TUT.

Studies leading up to a M.Sc. available in the Finnish language are:

- Architecture
- Automation Engineering
- Biotechnology
- Civil Engineering
- Electrical Engineering
- Environmental and Energy Technology
- Industrial Engineering and Management
- Information and Knowledge Management
- Information Technology
- Materials Engineering
- Fibre and Textile Engineering
- Mechanical Engineering
- Science and Engineering
- Mathematical Sciences Subject Teacher Education

=== International undergraduate degree programs ===
In August 2016 the first completely English taught B.Sc. program in the field of engineering in Finland started at TUT. The program of Science and Engineering aims to provide students a multi-disciplinary basic knowledge on different engineering and scientific subjects and offer a wide range of possibilities to continue studies in TUT's master's degree programs in English. Possible major subjects are Mathematics, Physics, and Information and Communications Technology.

Apart from the programs in the Finnish language, these M.Sc. programs are available in English:

- Sustainable Architecture
- Bioengineering
- Automation Engineering
- Electrical Engineering
- Industrial Engineering and Management
- Information Technology
- Materials Science
- Science and Engineering

=== Post-Graduate degree programs ===
All programs leading to M.Sc. also offer the possibility of continuing research until a doctoral degree. As usual in Finland, the completion of doctoral degree requires a certain number of courses taught (worth at least 60 ECTS) and a dissertation containing original scientific research, usually published in international peer-reviewed journals. Depending on the prior education of the student, the doctoral degree is either tekniikan tohtori (Doctor of Science in Technology or Architecture) or filosofian tohtori (Doctor of Philosophy). As a general rule, the graduate students with a master's degree in Technology or Architecture will be awarded the Doctor of Science degree, while graduate students with a master's degree in other majors will be awarded the degree of Doctor of Philosophy. A tekniikan lisensiaatti (Licentiate of Technology) is also available. Yearly, some 70 doctors graduate. The mean age of new doctors is 34.

== Student life ==
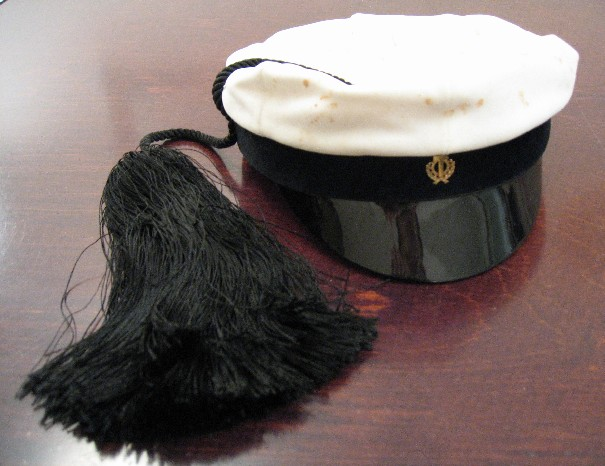
The cap of a student of technology (teekkarilakki).

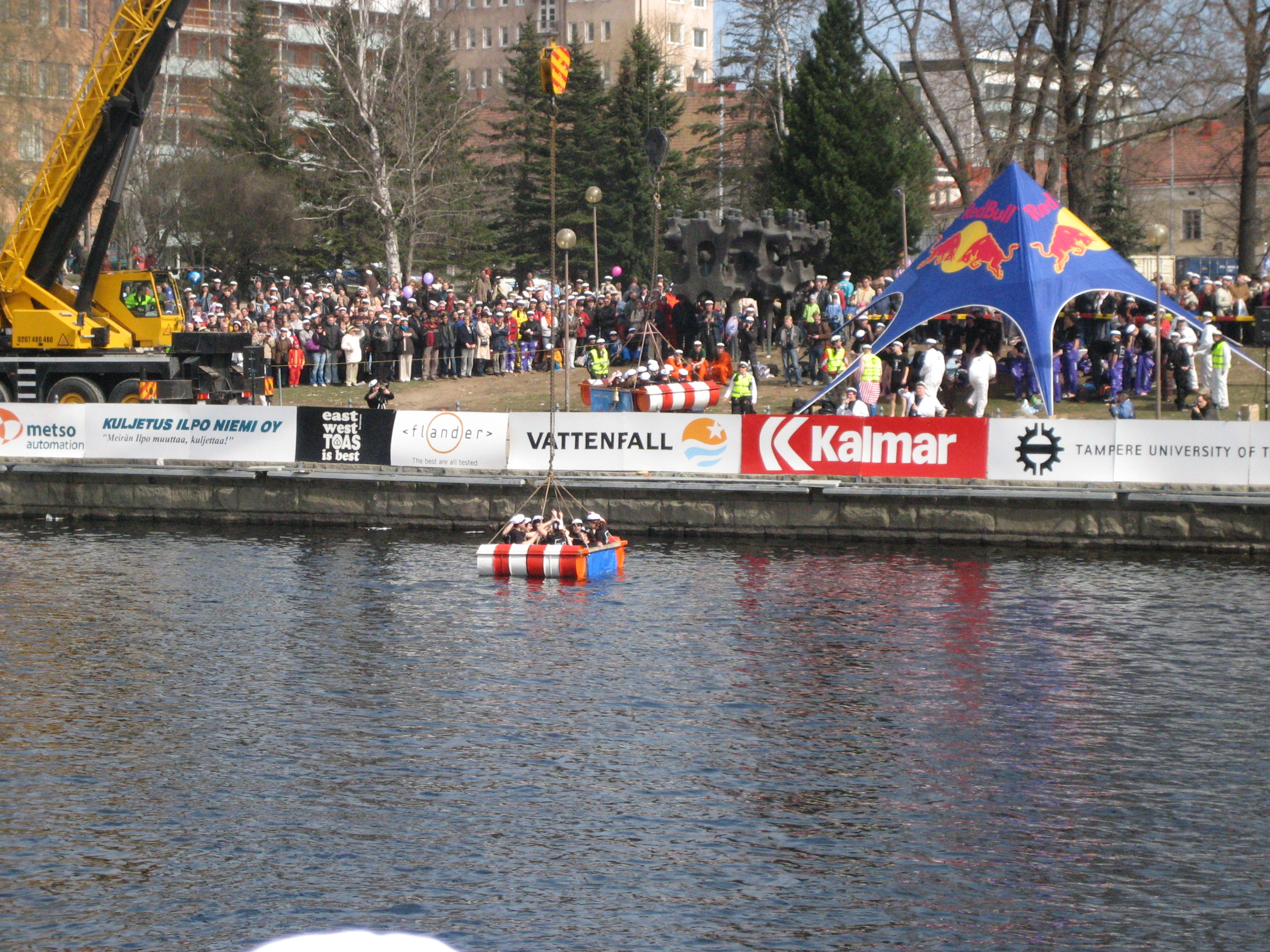
"Student baptism" for first year students in the rapids during Vappu

Student life at Tampere is especially vivid as three universities are located at the area. The students of technology (teekkarit) are especially noticeable, as they wear a distinctive hat with a tuft (teekkarilakki) on many occasions, both formal and informal. These student caps with a tuft are shared by every university in Finland that educates students of technology but the caps are slightly visually different in every university. Students of technology are also famous for student pranks (Finnish: jäynä), similar in principle to MIT hacks.

All undergraduate students are members of the Student Union of Tampere University of Technology. Post-graduate students are given the option of joining. In addition to the student union, students join numerous associations for studies, cultural activity, and sports. Each of the 14 guilds at TUT serve the students in their respective study program and has their uniquely coloured student boilersuit. There are also numerous other clubs that focus on different hobbies, such as, eSports, alpine skiing, sailing, photographing and skydiving.

More notable leisure clubs:

- Remmi-Team – Eco-marathon vehicles club
  - 26 Finnish championships,
  - 81 podium positions in different categories, and
  - 12 victories in international student-classes.
- Castor – Space club
  - Supikoira Rocket: First model rocket in Finland to climb up to 1.8 km (1.1 mi) altitude.
  - Itikka Project: First Finnish images from Space.
- Tampere Academic Symphony Orchestra (Finnish: Tampereen akateeminen sinfoniaorkesteri)

International clubs:

- AIESEC
- International Association for the Exchange of Students for Technical Experience
- Electrical Engineering Students' European Association
- European Students of Industrial Engineering and Management
- Erasmus Student Network

=== Student housing ===
Most of the undergraduate students at Tampere are living in apartments offered by the Tampere Student Housing Foundation (TOAS). TOAS offers different kinds of housing options also near the Hervanta campus. The apartments are typically small studios and shared flats. The most well-known student housing complex in Tampere region is Mikontalo.

== Notable people and alumni ==
- Hailemariam Desalegn – M.Sc. (Tech.), Prime Minister of Ethiopia
- Jarl-Thure Eriksson - Professor Emeritus, Rector 1997–2008
- Kari Jormakka - PhD, Architect
- Mikko Kaasalainen - PhD, Applied mathematician and mathematical physicist
- Ari Luotonen - M.Sc. (Tech.), Developer of CERN httpd
- Rainer Mahlamäki - M.Sc. (Arch.), Architect
- Jorma Rissanen - Professor Emeritus, IEEE Richard W. Hamming Medal
- Matti Viikinkoski - PhD, Mathematician specializing in inverse problems

== Rectors ==
- Jaakko Puhakka 2018
- Mika Hannula 2016–2018
- Markku Kivikoski 2008–2016
- Jarl-Thure Eriksson 1997–2008
- Timo Lepistö 1985–1996
- Osmo Hassi 1975–1985
- Pekka Ahonen 1972–1975

== See also ==
- Institute of technology
- List of universities in Finland
- Mikontalo
- University Consortium of Pori
