= EURIELEC =

European nonprofit pre-professional association

- Successor: EESTEC
- Established: 1964
- Dissolved: 1972
- Type: Pre-professional organization
- Legal status: Dissolved
- Purpose: Students
- Region served: Europe
- Official language: French then English

EURIELEC (European Association of Electrical Engineering Students) was a nonprofit pre-professional apolitical association for electrical engineering students that operated in Europe from 1964 to 1972. It incorporated member organizations from 13 European countries.

Initially, EURIELEC’s official language of communication was French, but it was unofficially changed to English in 1968.

EURIELEC is largely considered the predecessor of EESTEC, which was formed in the mid 80’s, about a decade later, in particular since the new organization was established with similar objectives in mind, and was joined by students from many of the electrical engineering programs that made up EURIELEC.

== History ==
=== Early discussions ===
Conversations about the need for an organization to promote professional and cultural exchange among electrical engineering students in Europe started between French and West German students in 1958. However, practical discussions kicked off only 5 years later, in 1963, when students from several European countries were invited to Paris and then to Munich for that purpose. The attendees decided to form an association to hold international student meetings and assist in obtaining internships. Despite the intentions, the founding of EURIELEC was deferred until late 1964, since the attendees felt that without registering a formal non-profit organization it would be difficult to raise funds and obtain the support of the industry.

=== Founding of EURIELEC ===
EURIELEC was founded in Berlin, on December 14, 1964, during a meeting attended by delegates from 18 different electrical engineering programs representing France, Germany, Italy, The Netherlands, Norway, Switzerland and Yugoslavia. During the meeting, Herman Van de Vijver from ETV Delft was elected as EURIELEC's first chairman, and the delegates from Delft took upon themselves to organize the congress of 1965.

=== Annual congress ===
The annual congresses included discussion and decision making regarding the organization, as well as professional symposia, local excursions organized by the hosts, and social events. The hosts of the EURIELEC annual congresses were:

Year (Note: A confusion regarding the calendar year versus the academic year caused some sources to incorrectly report the years of the EURIELEC congresses)	Location
1964	Berlin, West Germany (Note: Despite the significance of this gathering, it was not widely considered one of the annual EURIELEC congresses, since it was held prior to the affirmation of the EURIELEC statutes)
1965	Delft, The Netherlands
1966	Paris, France
1967	Berlin, West Germany
1968	Madrid, Spain
1969	Eindhoven, The Netherlands
1970 (canceled)	Prague, Czechoslovakia
1971	No congress held -

=== Dissolution ===
The late cancelation of the annual congress in Czechoslovakia in 1970, due to restrictions imposed by the "normalization" of Czechoslovakia, marked the beginning of the decline of the organization.

EURIELEC officially terminated its activities and dissolved in 1972, after none of the member organizations were able to host the congress in summer 1971, resulting in a second year in a row that EURIELEC members were not able to hold a formal meeting to discuss organizational matters.

=== Use of EURIELEC name ===
After the dissolution of EURIELEC, the student organization of ETSI de Telecomunicación in Madrid, the host of the fourth EURIELEC annual congress and the site of the organization's secretary general, kept the name EURIELEC Madrid and the EURIELEC logo, and is now known as simply EURIELEC. Now, they are part of EESTEC as LC Madrid, but they are known locally as EURIELEC.

== Objectives ==
EURIELEC was founded for the advancement of electrical engineering students in Europe. Its objectives were:

- Promoting contacts between electrical engineering students across Europe
- Exchanging information for study opportunities and visiting other similar programs
- Promoting and locating practical internships in foreign countries
- Coordinating activities for the members

== Membership ==
EURIELEC was structured as a supraorganization, and the students had to join their local student organization in order to take part in the international activities. The membership in EURIELEC was open to student groups from institutions in Europe awarding an electrical engineering degree, and in 1970 a total of 35 such local organizations were registered in EURIELEC from universities in France, West Germany, Italy, The Netherlands, Norway, Switzerland, Yugoslavia, Belgium, Spain, Czechoslovakia, Austria, Sweden and Finland.

== See also ==
- EESTEC (Electrical Engineering Students' European Association)
- IEEE (Institute of Electrical and Electronics Engineers)
- EUREL (Convention of National Associations of Electrical Engineers of Europe)
