= G. Steven Bova =

American physician-scientist and pathologist

George Steven Bova
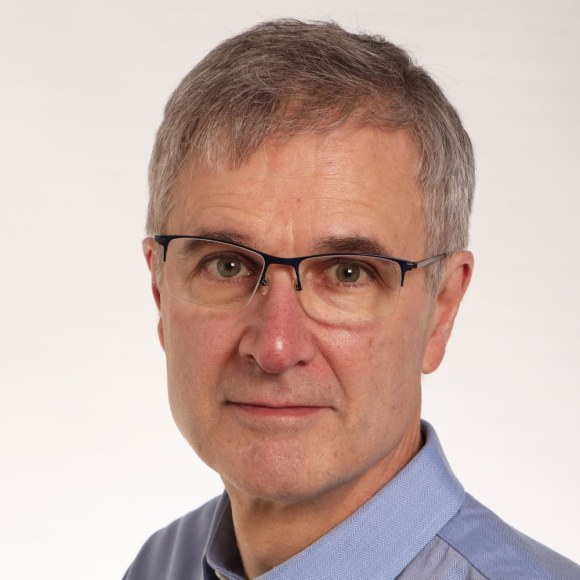
- Born: Toledo, Ohio, U.S.
- Education: Dartmouth College; Weill Cornell Medical College
- Known for: Genomics of metastatic prostate cancer; Translational cancer medicine
- Scientific career
- Fields: Pathology, Cancer genomics, Biomedical informatics
- Workplaces: Johns Hopkins University; Tampere University

George Steven Bova is an American physician-scientist, pathologist, and researcher best known for his work on the genomics and evolutionary history of metastatic prostate cancer, biomedical research informatics, and translational cancer medicine. He is Emeritus Professor of Personalized Cancer Medicine at Tampere University (Finland), founder and CEO of Orbican Systems (U.S. & Finland), and founder of the research informatics company BioFortis (Labmatrix). As of 2025, Bova has an h-index of 76 according to Google Scholar.

== Early life and education ==
Bova was born in Toledo, Ohio. He earned an A.B., with distinction, from Dartmouth College and an M.D. from Weill Cornell Medical College. He completed pathology residency training at The New York Hospital–Weill Cornell Medical Center and later training in general and urologic surgery, including a chief residency in urology at the University of Virginia. From 1991 to 1993 he was an American Foundation for Urologic Disease Molecular Biology Research Scholar. Bova served as a U.S. Peace Corps volunteer in Techiman, Ghana from 1978 to 1980.

== Work in Ghana, West Africa ==
In 1979, Bova helped establish the Primary Health Training for Indigenous Healers (PRHETIH) project in Techiman, Ghana, in partnership with the Holy Family Hospital. The program aimed to strengthen collaboration between biomedical practitioners and traditional healers, including herbalists, birth attendants, and ritual specialists, to expand access to basic health care in rural communities.

PRHETIH provided structured training sessions covering hygiene, preventive health, child care, preservation of medicinal plants, and treatment of common illnesses. By 1983, more than 80 traditional healers had completed the program. The project has been cited in health policy studies as one of the earliest and most ambitious attempts in Ghana to integrate traditional medicine into primary health care.

The PRHETIH initiative was documented in the film Healers of Ghana directed by Scott Dodds. As part of his work in Techiman, Bova also co-authored the manual Better Child Care, which provided practical guidance on child health and development for caregivers.

== Academic and professional career ==
Bova served on the faculty of the Johns Hopkins University School of Medicine from 1994 through 2011 with appointments in pathology, genetic medicine, health sciences informatics, oncology, and urology. During this period, he directed the PELICAN (Project to ELIminate CANcer) Research Medical Informatics Laboratory, which integrated clinical, pathologic, and molecular data from patients with lethal metastatic disease.

Bova later joined Tampere University (Faculty of Medicine and Health Technology), where he held professorial positions in personalized cancer medicine (Finnish Distinguished Professor, 2012–2016; Professor, 2016–2024; emeritus Professor, 2024–present). He is also the founder and CEO of Orbican Systems Inc. and Orbican Oy, companies that bring cancer evolution–based tumor profiling and informatics into clinical and research practice.

He has served as Principal investigator for projects within international consortia, including ICGC/TCGA and related prostate cancer projects.

== Research ==
Bova's research focuses on integrative approaches to cancer, combining clinical phenomics, tissue processing, whole-genome and transcriptome sequencing, computational analysis, and informatics, with an emphasis on the evolutionary dynamics of metastatic disease and translational applications for precision oncology. He assembled teams that helped prove the value of including integrated molecular "rapid" autopsy studies to accelerate development of precision cancer medicine. His laboratory and collaborators have published extensively on the genomic evolution of lethal metastatic prostate cancer, intratumoral heterogeneity, copy-number and methylation changes, androgen receptor splice variants, mobile element (L1) retrotransposition in cancer, and methods for tissue and data management for molecular profiling.

Among the research concepts associated with Bova are the institution of integrative molecular autopsy/multisample analyses of lethal metastatic cancer (PELICAN), contributions to the demonstration of monoclonal origins and evolutionary paths of lethal metastases, and the identification of analytical methods such as Differential Subclone Eradication and Resistance (DSER) for identifying therapeutic targets and subclone response patterns. In 2024, a U.S. patent was issued for a method related to identifying targets for precision cancer therapy attributed to Bova and collaborators.

== Honours and professional service ==
Bova has received the Tampere University Best Publication Award (2021) and the AACR–Korean Cancer Association Poster Award (2021). He has served on professional boards and advisory bodies, including the Finnish Cancer Institute Scientific Advisory Board, and participated in international genomics and cancer research consortia. He is a peer reviewer for journals in oncology, pathology, and genomics.

== Datasets ==
Bova has contributed to and curated major multisample sequencing and phenome datasets (PELICAN33 and ICGC/CRUK prostate cancer whole-genome datasets) deposited in controlled-access archives, such as the European Genome Archive (EGA), supporting multisample evolutionary analyses and translational research.

== Selected publications ==
- Gundem, G; Van Loo, P; Kremeyer, B; Alexandrov, LB; Tubio, JMC; Papaemmanuil, E; Brewer, DS; Kallio, HML; Högnäs, G; Annala, M; Kivinummi, K; Goody, V; Latimer, C; O'Meara, S; Dawson, KJ; Isaacs, W; Emmert-Buck, MR; Nykter, M; Foster, C; Kote-Jarai, Z; Easton, D; Whitaker, HC; Neal, DE; Cooper, CS; Eeles, RA; Visakorpi, T; Campbell, P; McDermott, U; Wedge, DC; Bova, GS (2015). "The evolutionary history of lethal metastatic prostate cancer". Nature. 520 (7547): 353–357. Bibcode:2015Natur.520..353.. doi:10.1038/nature14347. PMC 4413032. PMID 25830880.
- Liu, W; Laitinen, S; Khan, S; Vihinen, M; Kowalski, J; Yu, G; Chen, L; Ewing, CM; Eisenberger, MA; Carducci, MA; Nelson, WG; Yegnasubramanian, S; Luo, J; Isaacs, WB; Visakorpi, T; Bova, GS (2009). "Copy number analysis indicates monoclonal origin of lethal metastatic prostate cancer". Nature Medicine. 15 (5): 560–565. doi:10.1038/nm.1944. PMC 2839160. PMID 19363497.
- Tubio, JM; Li, Y; Ju, YS; Martincorena, I; Cooke, SL; Tojo, M; Gundem, G; Pipinikas, CP; Zamora, J; Raine, K; Menzies, A; Roman-Garcia, P; Fullam, A; Gerstung, M; Shlien, A; Tarpey, PS; Nangalia, J; Massie, CE; Campbell, P; McDermott, U; Wedge, DC; Stratton, MR; Futreal, PA; Flanagan, AM; Bova, GS (2014). "Extensive transduction of nonrepetitive DNA mediated by L1 retrotransposition in cancer genomes". Science. 345 (6196) 1251343. doi:10.1126/science.1251343. PMC 4380235. PMID 25082706.
- Ketola, K; Kaljunen, H; Taavitsainen, S; Kaarijärvi, R; Järvelä, E; Rodriguez Martin, B; Haase, K; Woodcock, DJ; Tubio, J; Wedge, DC; Nykter, M; Bova, GS (2021). "Subclone eradication analysis identifies targets for enhanced cancer therapy and reveals L1 retrotransposition as a dynamic source of cancer heterogeneity". Cancer Research. 81 (19): 4901–4909. doi:10.1158/0008-5472.CAN-21-0371. PMC 9397610. PMID 34348967.
- Woodcock, DJ; Riabchenko, E; Taavitsainen, S; Kankainen, M; Gundem, G; Brewer, DS; Ellonen, P; Lepistö, M; Golubeva, YG; Warner, AC; Tolonen, TT; Jasu, J; Isaacs, WB; Emmert-Buck, MR; Nykter, M; Visakorpi, T; Bova, GS; Wedge, DC (2020). "Prostate cancer evolution from multilineage primary to single lineage metastasis in ten men with implications for liquid biopsy". Nature Communications. 11 (1): 5070. doi:10.1038/s41467-020-18843-5. PMC 7545111. PMID 33033260.
