= European Students of Industrial Engineering and Management =

European Students of Industrial Engineering and Management (ESTIEM)
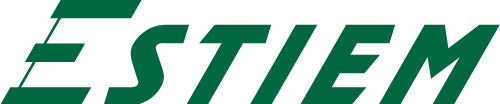
- Logo of ESTIEM
- Formation: 1990
- Type: Non-profit, Non-governmental, Non-political
- Legal status: Active
- Purpose: Education
- Headquarters: Eindhoven, Netherlands
- Region served: Europe
- Official language: English
- Website: www.estiem.org
- Remarks: The sole European Industrial Engineering and Management Student Organisation

European Students of Industrial Engineering and Management (ESTIEM) is a non-profit, non-governmental and non-political student organisation that connects European students that combine technological understanding with management skills. The goal of this organisation is to establish and foster relations between students across Europe and support them in their professional and personal development. As of June 2025, the ESTIEM network counts over 8,000 students that are registered in 76 universities from 26 countries.

ESTIEM has its seat in Eindhoven, Netherlands.

== History ==
The idea of the network was created during the WIFO 1990 seminar that was held in Darmstadt in January 1990. During the mentioned meeting participants from Darmstadt, Dresden, Graz, Helsinki and Karlsruhe decided to integrate a network of IEM Students and graduates to "enhance communication and co-operation". This network was called EAIM (European Association of Industrial Management). In November 1990 the statute of ESTIEM was signed in Berlin by representatives of 14 student groups from 6 countries. ESTIEM is an official student organisation registered in Eindhoven, since 1995.

== Today ==
Annually, ESTIEM delivers over 160 European wide events to its network of over 8,000 students. These events aim to support students in their personal and professional development by educating them in: Soft skills, IEM Seminars, Case Study competitions and Entrepreneurship. ESTIEM publishes two Magazines annually that claim to provide insight into "forward-looking topics" in Industrial Engineering and Management, the print run is approximately 3000 copies.

== Structure ==
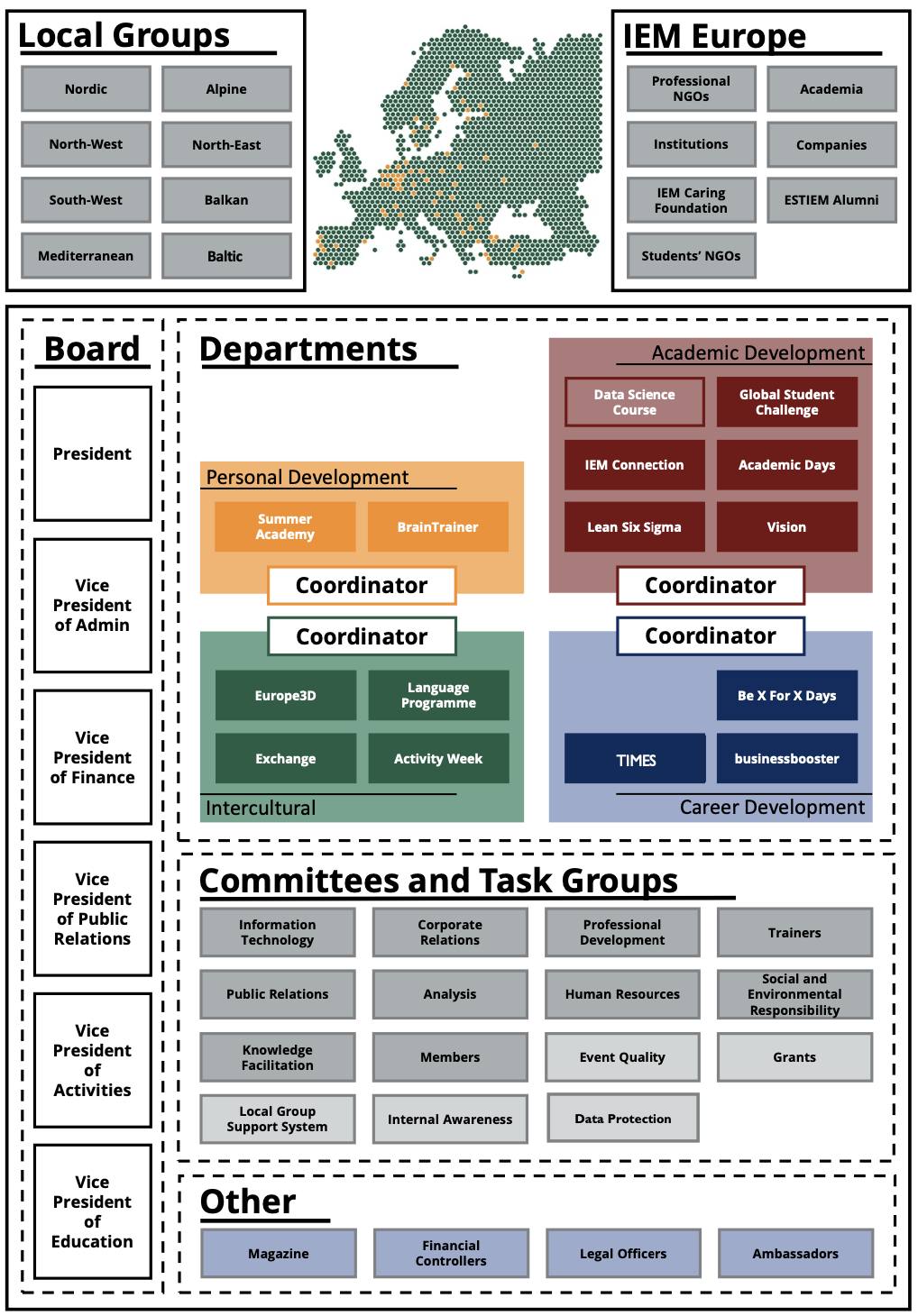
Structure of ESTIEM

The network consists of its Local Groups, which function as independent entities connected to IEM study programmes at universities over Europe. The purpose of the central level is to support the Local Groups in their activities.

=== The central level ===
- The Board of ESTIEM is the core managing and responsible body of the organisation. It is constituted of six students who are being elected every spring.
- Committees & task groups, their task is to support the Board on operational tasks in specific areas of its responsibility.
- Services that are responsible to support Local Groups when organising an event and to provide services to students. Services are grouped in 4 departments.
- Regions are committees of the Board and they gather Local Groups in a similar geographical area. Each Region has its own Regional Coordinator who is the bridge between the Board & Central ESTIEM on one side and Local Groups on the other.

== Council Meetings ==
The decision-making body of the network is the General Assembly, which meets twice a year in autumn and in spring at the Council Meeting. Each Local Group sends two student representatives.

== Benefits for students ==
ESTIEM offers students opportunities to develop themselves, including seminars, case study competitions, summer academies and training. These activities are set in an intercultural context, where individuals may find that different mentalities challenges their way of thinking. Making friends and exploring Europe by participating in European wide events that encourages open-mindedness, paving the way for friendships and a network of future colleagues across borders.

== Local Groups ==
Country	City
Austria	Graz, Vienna
Azerbaijan	Baku (Guest)
Belgium	Brussels, Liège
Bosnia and Herzegovina	Sarajevo (Guest)
Bulgaria	Sofia
Croatia	Zagreb
Cyprus	Famagusta
Estonia	Tallinn
Finland	Helsinki, Lappeenranta, Oulu, Tampere, Vaasa
France	Auvergne (Clermont-Ferrand), Grenoble, Lyon
Germany	Aachen, Berlin, Braunschweig, Bremen, Darmstadt, Dortmund, Dresden, Hamburg, Ilmenau, Kaiserslautern, Karlsruhe, Munich, Paderborn, Siegen
Greece	Piraeus, Xanthi
Hungary	Budapest
Italy	Calabria, Cassino (Guest)
North Macedonia	Skopje
Netherlands	Delft, Eindhoven, Groningen
Norway	Trondheim
Poland	Gdańsk, Kraków, Warsaw
Portugal	Aveiro, Coimbra, Lisbon, Minho, Porto
Romania	Bucharest, Sibiu, Târgu Mureș
Russia	Moscow, Saint Petersburg
Serbia	Belgrade, Novi Sad, Niš
Spain	Barcelona, Cartagena, Madrid, Seville
Sweden	Gothenburg, Linköping, Luleå, Lund, Stockholm, Karlstad
Turkey	Ankara-Bilkent, Ankara-METU, Istanbul-Bogazici, Istanbul-ITU, Istanbul-Yıldız, İzmir-DEU, İzmir-Economy
Ukraine	Kyiv

Local Groups are being divided into Regions in ESTIEM, every Region has a Regional Coordinator that is responsible to ensure the communication and cooperation among the members.

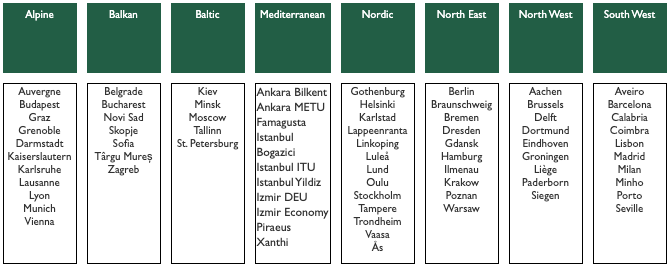
ESTIEM Local Groups Divided into Regions (April 2020, outdated)

== ESTIEM Board ==
The Board of ESTIEM consists of six members. They are elected by the General Assembly every spring Council Meeting and their mandates last from the 1st of August to the 31st of July.

Position	Name	Local Group
President	Adrian Bösl	Munich
Vice President of Finance	Inci Yerebasmaz	Ankara-METU
Vice President of Administration	Tom Louis Landgraf	Berlin
Vice President of Education	Marta Correira	Minho
Vice President of Activities	Eszter Farkas	Budapest
Vice President of Public Relations	Doga Güneri	Ankara-METU

== International events ==
The ESTIEM network created and supports multiple international events that take place in ESTIEM's Local Groups. They aim to train and educate students in various hard and soft skills.

- Activity Week is a 6-day event where participants get to know an aspect of the local culture or lifestyle through a series of activities.
- Be X for X Days connects students and experienced industry professionals offering participants hands-on experience in various positions, depending on the theme of the event.
- BrainTrainer provides soft and business skills such as communication, presentation, negotiation and team-management.
- businessbooster is an ESTIEM Project that promotes and stimulates entrepreneurship among students by organizing different training, educational and networking events and competitions.
- Language Programme is created to improve the communication within ESTIEM and giving ESTIEMers an opportunity to learn a language from native speakers amongst other ESTIEMers with its various online and offline offerings.
- Lean Six Sigma Green Belt course was developed with help from Gregory H. Watson and it offers ESTIEMers to obtain an LSS Green Belt Certificate.
- Local Group Exchange gives an opportunity to members of one local group to visit another local group and then return the hospitality.
- Europe3D gathers students from all around the world in a 7–8 days event where the participants get to learn more about three distinct dimensions of a country: politics, economy and culture.
- ESTIEM Magazine is the official publication of ESTIEM. It is published twice a year and distributed at Council Meetings. The run of 3000 magazines reaches 78 universities in 28 European countries.
- Summer Academy has the focus of developing the competence of creative leadership by engaging in open discussion, group work, debate and private study under a senior Academic Leader
- TIMES – The Tournament In Management and Engineering Skills is the largest pan-European case study competition for Industrial Engineering and Management students. This event has been organised since 1994 and attracts over 250 teams each year.
- Vision is a seminar series on a yearly topic related to technology, society and/or economics where participants could get a good grasp of the industry. In 2019, yearly topics were dropped but the event type kept going with independent topics related to aforementioned dimensions.

== Partner organisations ==
In June 2024, ESTIEM counts four collaborations with student organisations:

- VWI (Verband Deutscher Wirtschaftsingenieure)
- BEST (Board of European Students of Technology)
- EESTEC (Electrical Engineering Students' European Association)
- AEGEE (European Students Forum)

Other collaborations with ESTIEM:

- EPIEM (European Professors of Industrial Engineering and Management)
- IISE (Institute of Industrial & System Engineers)
- SEFI (European Society for Engineering Education)
- IEM Caring Movement
