= Mikontalo =

Student housing complex in Tampere, Finland

Coordinates: 61°26′47.40″N 023°51′10.80″E

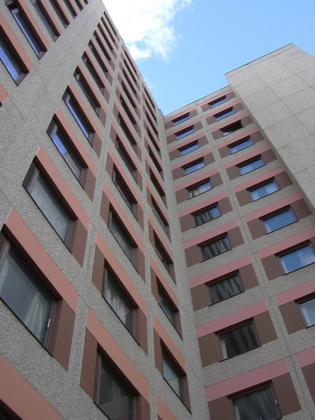
View to top of Mikontalo, showing the old panel colors

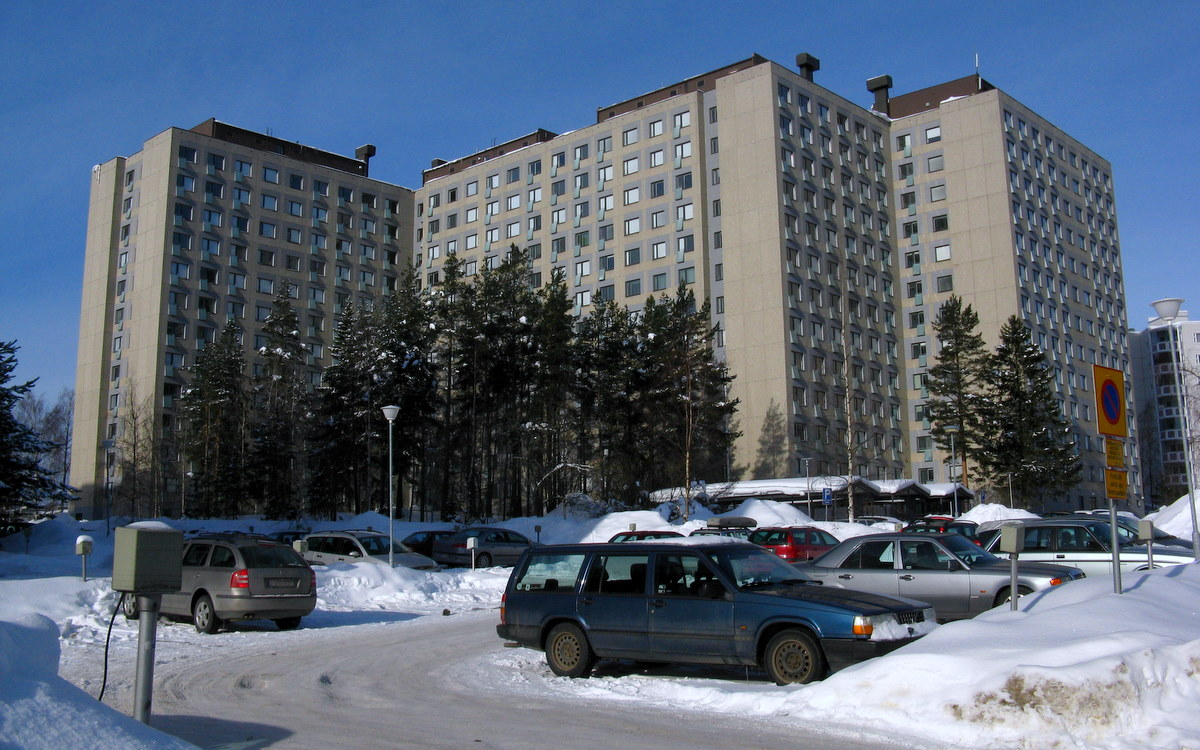
Mikontalo in 2010

Mikontalo is a large student housing complex in Hervanta, Tampere, Finland. Its exact address is Insinöörinkatu 60, 33720 Tampere, Finland.

With affordable rents, easy availability, and location near the Hervanta campus of Tampere University, it is a popular dwelling for first year students and exchange students.

Mikontalo was built during the period 1978–1980. Representing brutalism, it consists of 4 blocks with 12 floors where 767 dwellings are situated. Mikontalo offers for its inhabitants saunas (two per building), a free gym, public lounge with a TV-set, Nintendo Wii, Soundsystem, board games, coffee machine and microwave; laundry room (5 washing and 2 drying machines), cable TV, and connection to the Internet.

The building went through major renovations from Summer 2007 until Summer 2009. During the renovation juliet balconies were added to some of the apartments. Also the façade panels were painted with bluish grey color, replacing red, orange and yellow colors.

== Mikontalo Lights ==
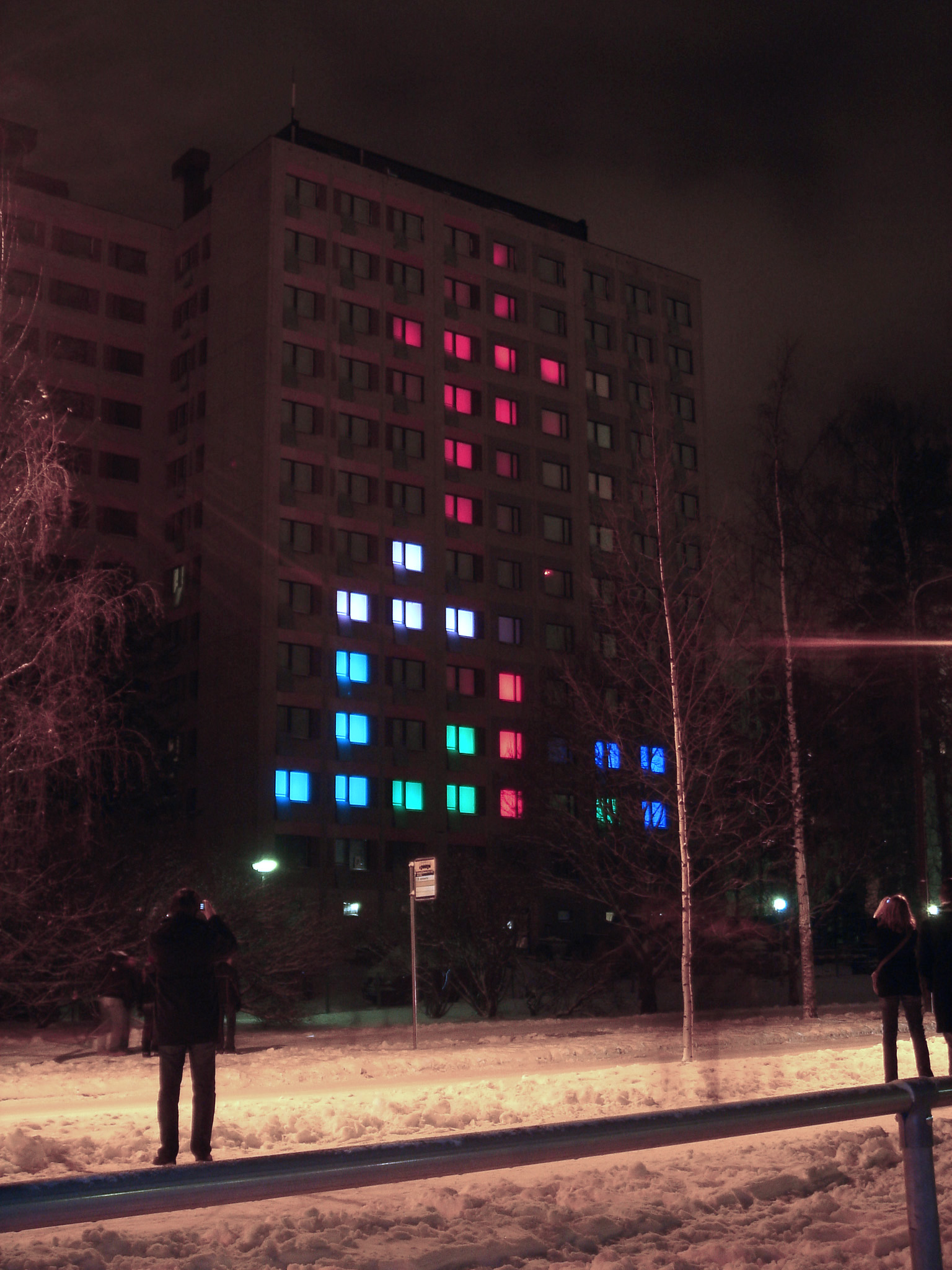
Mikontalolights event

In early December 2007, the D block of Mikontalo, while undergoing the reconstruction, was the scene of the Mikontalolights project.

The object of Mikontalolights project was to create the world's physically largest colored graphics platform by using the windows of Mikontalo's D block as light pixels. The platform was used for playing Tetris and other games and present demos created by the students of Tampere University of Technology. The project climaxed on December 4 when the new lights of the building were lit. The goal was to gain global visibility for Tampere University of Technology and the rich student culture of city of Tampere.

Mikontalolights was a part of the 42nd jubilee year of the Student Union of Tampere University of Technology. Mikontalolights was fully carried out by students who were willing to give their work contribution besides their studies. TOAS and the building contractor of Mikontalo Rakennustoimisto Palmberg Oy made it possible to accomplish Mikontalolights by providing Mikontalo as a platform for the project.
