= Jarl-Thure Eriksson =

Finnish electrical engineer and academic administrator

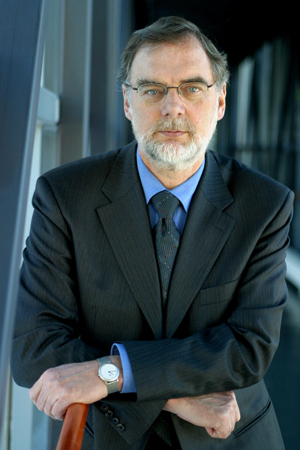
- Eriksson at Tampere University of Technology
- Born: 5 November 1944 (age 82); Hammarland, Åland, Finland
- Occupations: Professor, academic administrator

Jarl-Thure Eriksson (born 5 November 1944) is a Finnish electrical engineer and academic administrator. He was rector of Tampere University of Technology (TUT) from 1997 to 2008 and chancellor of Åbo Akademi University from 2010 to 2014. He also chaired the international selection committee of the Millennium Technology Prize from 2011 to 2016.

== Early life and education ==
Eriksson was born in Hammarland, Åland. He received a doctorate from Helsinki University of Technology (HUT) in 1982 and became a docent of electromechanics there in the same year.

== Career ==
From 1970 to 1980 Eriksson was a research administrator at the Laboratory of Electromechanics at HUT. He was also a senior research fellow at the university's Low Temperature Laboratory in 1974–75 and 1978–79. He moved to TUT in 1980 as acting associate professor, became associate professor in 1983, and was professor of electrical engineering there from 1987 until 2008. In 1985–86 he was a visiting professor at the KTH Royal Institute of Technology in Stockholm, and from 1987 to 1990 he was dean of TUT's Department of Electrical Engineering.

Eriksson was TUT's rector from 1997 to 2008 and chaired its board of directors over the same period. In June 2008 he and the rectors of the University of Jyväskylä and the University of Tampere signed the agreement for the Yliopistoallianssi (University Alliance), a cooperation between the three universities.

At Åbo Akademi he was chancellor from 2010 to 2014. He was a member of the board of Technology Academy Finland, the foundation that awards the Millennium Technology Prize, from 2003 to 2009, and chaired the prize's international selection committee for the 2012, 2014 and 2016 prizes. Eriksson has been a member of the Finnish Academy of Technology since 1989 and was president of the Swedish Academy of Engineering Sciences in Finland from 2013 to 2019.

== Research ==
Eriksson's research areas have included superconductivity, electric machines for hybrid cars and wind turbines, complex systems, and theories of cognition.

Since 2018 he has also published papers on cosmology. A 2026 paper in Particles presents what he calls the Continuously Breeding Universe model, in which the gravitational parameter G varies with the size of the universe.

== Honours ==
In 1998, Eriksson was made a Commander of the Order of the Lion of Finland. He received the City of Tampere's Tampere Prize in 2006. In 2021, he was named an honorary member of the Swedish Academy of Engineering Sciences in Finland.
