= Electrical Engineering Students' European Association =

Electrical Engineering

Electrical Engineering STudents' European assoCiation
- Abbreviation: EESTEC
- Established: May 3, 1986 (40 years ago)
- Type: Pre-professional organization
- Purpose: Students
- Headquarters: Zurich, Switzerland
- Region served: Europe
- Methods: Congresses, exchanges, workshops, internships
- Members: 5000+
- Official language: English
- Key people: Board of EESTEC: Teodora Popović (Chairperson); Aleksandar Dodik (Treasurer); Tuna Ünsal (VC External affairs); Çağrı Boz (VC Internal affairs); Zeynep Nur Özgür (VC Administrative affairs)
- Website: www.eestec.net

The Electrical Engineering STudents' European assoCiation (EESTEC) (Note: The EESTEC acronym stands for "Electrical Engineering STudents' European assoCiation") is a nonprofit apolitical and non-governmental student organization for Electrical Engineering and Computer Science (EECS) students at universities, institutes and schools of technology in Europe awarding an engineering degree. As of March 2020, there were 48 current locations in EESTEC from 24 countries, although several other locations were active in EESTEC over the years.

As a pre-professional organization, EESTEC puts a strong emphasis on the development of a general skillset, with soft-skill growth added to the mastery of the academic and professional skillset of the field. The organization aims to promote and develop international contacts and the exchange of ideas among EECS students through professional workshops, cultural student exchanges and publications.

EESTEC was founded in 1986 in Eindhoven, Netherlands. The official seat moved several times until finally moving to Zurich, Switzerland in 2021, its current location.

== History ==
=== Pre-EESTEC ===
Discussions about the need for an international organization for electrical engineering students are dated back to 1957, when students from France and West Germany met in an attempt to form such a group. It was not, however, until five years later that a European association, called EURIELEC, was formed.

Despite the success in its early years, EURIELEC was dissolved in 1972. Various attempts were made over the next twelve years, but no organization was able to form a sustainable structure to reconnect electrical engineering students in Europe.

In 1984, the boards of three Dutch student guilds from ETV (Delft), Thor (Eindhoven) and Scintilla (Enschede), decided to try and reignite the interest of other European student associations in renewing the international student activities. They exchanged ideas with professional organizations such as IEEE, EUREL and SEFI, and in January 1985 wrote the first letter to all former EURIELEC member universities, inviting them to take part in a new international annual conference for electrical engineering students, which they later named EESTIC (Electrical Engineering STudents International Conference).

=== The early years ===
The inaugural gathering was held in Eindhoven, The Netherlands, between April 27 and May 3, 1986, and was attended by 50 students from 33 different cities in 17 different countries (Austria, Belgium, Czechoslovakia, England, Finland, France, Hungary, Italy, The Netherlands, Norway, Poland, Portugal, Spain, Sweden, Switzerland, West Germany and Yugoslavia).

A meeting during a visit to the Peace Palace in The Hague on the last day of the conference is considered to be the founding of EESTEC. The delegates agreed on a list of 14 clauses, describing the structure and function of the newly formed organization. The official seat was assigned to Ghent, Belgium, and the concept of NatComs (National Committees) was introduced, as a single point of contact for each country. The resolutions included a change of the name to EESTEC (Electrical Engineering STudents European Conference), as with very minor exceptions, the involved countries were European. The first EESTEC newsletter was printed later that year.

The following years saw a growth in the organization, as countries like Greece, Denmark, Bulgaria, Israel, Malta, GDR, Russia, and Romania were accepted and became active. Successful conferences induced a surge in student exchanges and workshops that filled the year with activity.

Some key changes were made to the statutes during the 4th conference in Budapest in 1989. Although the EESTEC acronym was kept, the full name was changed to Electrical Engineering STudents European association to reflect the year-round activities. The annual meeting was also renamed from "Conference" to "Congress", and the first international board was elected, consisting of a chairman (Peter Zijlema from The Netherlands) and one vice-chairman (Pawel Karlowski from Poland).

The structure of the international board was changed a year later in Zurich, as the second board was elected, with Filip Van Den Bossche from Belgium as chairman, and two vice-chairmen: Sigmar Lampe from West Germany, and Peter Stieger from Austria.

Two new members for the third international board were elected during the following Congress in Vienna in 1991: Zsolt Berend from Hungary as chairman, and Yoed Nehoran from Israel as vice-chairman. Sigmar Lampe was reconfirmed and kept his vice-chairman position from the prior year. Just before the close of the Vienna Congress, the official seat of EESTEC was moved to Budapest, Hungary.

=== Other noteworthy milestones ===
EESTEC was officially incorporated in 1994, and the official seat was moved from Budapest to Zurich to facilitate international financial transactions, though it was moved again seven years later from Zurich to Delft, as part of an attempt to obtain financial support from the European Union.

Also in 1995, the NatComs were eliminated, giving each LC (Local Committee) direct representation at the EESTEC activities, and its own levels of engagement.

Alumni relations functions were added to the organization in 1998.

Official collaboration with IEEE began in 2003, when a memorandum of understanding regarding joint international events was signed between the two organizations.

Although the logo prepared for the conference in Nova Gorica, Yugoslavia was adopted as the EESTEC logo back in 1987, it was only recognized as the organization's official logo in 1996. In 2007, the EESTEC logo was recolored and simplified, removing the background grid and centering the S, to make the official logo what it is today.

=== Hosts of the EESTEC congress ===
- 1986: The Netherlands CIC, Eindhoven
- 1987: Yugoslavia NatCom, Nova Gorica
- 1988: Portugal NatCom, Lisbon/Aveiro
- 1989: Hungary NatCom, Budapest
- 1990: Switzerland NatCom, Zurich
- 1991: Austria NatCom, Vienna
- 1992: Spain NatCom, Madrid
- 1993: Hungary NatCom, Budapest
- 1994: Germany NatCom, Aachen
- 1995: Switzerland NatCom, Zurich
- 1996: LC Aachen
- 1997: LC Tampere and LC Helsinki
- 1998: LC Reggio Emilia
- 1999: LC Ljubljana
- 2000: LC Delft
- 2001: LC London
- 2002: LC Budapest
- 2003: LC Cosenza
- 2004: LC Belgrade
- 2005: LC Madrid
- 2006: LC Sofia
- 2007: LC Budapest
- 2008: LC Ljubljana and LC Rijeka
- 2009: LC Belgrade and LC Sarajevo
- 2010: LC Athens
- 2011: LC Craiova
- 2012: LC Riga and LC Tallinn
- 2013: LC Munich
- 2014: LC Athens
- 2015: LC Madrid
- 2016: LC Belgrade
- 2016: Autumn Congress: LC Belgrade
- 2017: Spring Congress: LC Ljubljana
- 2017: Autumn Congress: LC Zagreb
- 2018: Spring Congress: LC Krakow
- 2018: Autumn Congress: LC Budapest
- 2019: Spring Congress: LC Athens
- 2019: Autumn Congress: LC Aachen, LC Karlsruhe LC Munich and JLC Duisburg
- 2020: Spring Congress: LC Novi Sad, conducted remotely due to COVID-19
- 2021: Autumn Congress: LC Munich, conducted remotely due to COVID-19
- 2021: Spring Congress: LC Krakow, conducted remotely due to COVID-19
- 2021: Autumn Congress: LC Zurich
- 2022: Spring Congress: LC Belgrade
- 2022: Autumn Congress: LC Istanbul, conducted remotely
- 2023: Spring Congress: LC Munich
- 2023: Autumn Congress: did not happen due to no organising committee
- 2024: Spring Congress: LC Ljubljana
- 2024: Autumn Congress: LC Belgrade
- 2025: Spring Congress: LC Banja Luka
- 2025: Autumn Congress: LC Krakow
- 2026: Spring Congress: LC Thessaloniki
- 2026: Autumn Congress: LC Novi Sad

=== EESTEC locations ===
Map of EESTEC Local Committees

== Aim ==
The primary aim of EESTEC is to promote and develop international contacts between students and professionals. The exchange of ideas and experience among Electrical Engineering and Computer Science students is made possible through the activities of the association. EESTEC is also promoting international career and job opportunities for students.

Based on Strategic Plan 2018 – 2023, EESTEC's aim is: The aim is to promote and develop international contacts and the exchange of ideas among the students of EECS. The Association shall try to achieve its aim through the following principal activities:

- Professional workshops on topics in the field of EECS
- Cultural student exchanges
- Publication and distribution of articles on technical subjects
- Other activities directed at achieving the aim

== Organizational structure ==
EESTEC is composed of the following bodies:

=== General Assembly ===
The general assembly (GA) is the convergence of all congress participants, with the right to make governing decisions regarding EESTEC. It serves as the supreme decision-making body of the association and convenes at least once during the Congress, where each attending LC is granted one vote.

=== The Board of the Association ===
The EESTEC Board takes care of the administration of EESTEC throughout the year and is elected by the GA. There are five positions on the board: Chairperson, Treasurer, Vice-Chairperson for External Affairs, Vice-Chairperson for Internal Affairs, and Vice-Chairperson for Administrative Affairs. The concept of a Board of the Association was first introduced during the annual congress in 1989, with only a chairperson and a vice-chairperson. The composition of the board kept evolving through the years, first adding a second vice-chairperson (1990), then a treasurer (1995), and finally a webmaster (2001), a position which was subsequently transformed into the vice-chairperson for publications & administration (2004). In 2016, based on archetypes of every position, instead of the position of vice-chairperson for publications & administration, the position of Vice-Chairperson of Administrative Affairs is introduced.

=== Supervisory Board ===
The Supervisory Board (SB) is an independent advisory committee responsible for overseeing the work and financial actions taken by the Board. The Supervisory Board reports its observations to the Congress general assembly. The term Supervisory Board was introduced during the Autumn Congress in Essen in 2019. The previous term was Oversight Committee.

=== International Bureau ===
The international bureau (IB) serves as the record keeper of EESTEC and is responsible for archiving all the material data of the organization.

=== Spring and Autumn Congress Organizing Committee ===
The congress organizing committee (COC) is appointed at the end of the Congress and is tasked to organize the following Congress, including the responsibility to host the attendees, preside over the general meetings, and issue the congress guide and congress report. There are Spring Congress Organizing Committee (SCOC) and Autumn Congress Organizing Committee (ACOC). On each, the next is elected by the GA.

== Membership ==
As a supraorganization, the membership in EESTEC is open to electrical engineering and computer science student groups in universities, institutes, and schools of technology. Most of the groups seeking membership are existing student organizations in such programs, yet in many cases, students form a new group specifically to gain membership in EESTEC. There are three gradual engagement levels in EESTEC:

- Observer is a status granted by the Board of the Association for a student group that is interested in EESTEC. It is the first step in joining EESTEC as an official member.
- JLC (Junior Local Committee) status can be granted by the Board of the Association after the Observer is legally recognized by its University.
- LC (Local Committee) is a full member of EESTEC when JLC successfully organizes at least one official EESTEC Event. This level requires continuous activity in the organization.

== Activities ==
=== Workshops ===
The Electrical Engineering and Computer Science aspects of EESTEC are expressed through workshops, the most important activity of the association. During a project week, lectures are presented by specialists from the industry and universities. Discussions are also held in small group sessions. Topics for workshops are mainly chosen based on technologies in Electrical Engineering and Computer Science, economics or soft-skills. An EESTEC Workshop is a professional event combined with social activities.

=== Exchanges ===
During an exchange student can visit another city for a week. During these multilateral meetings the participants gain awareness of the foreign university life, industry and cultural aspects.

=== Lykeion ===
Lykeion was an EESTEC online portal, connecting students, companies, and universities directly. Its aim is to give students the opportunity to easily search for internships, jobs, Bachelor, Master and PhD study programs.

=== Training ===
EESTEC has its own training system aiming at developing the skills of its members. For this, members are trained in becoming EESTEC Trainers.

=== ECM (EESTEC Chairpersons' Meeting) ===
ECM was a meeting where the chairpersons of all LCs, JLCs, and Observers participate to share experiences, contribute to the future development of EESTEC, and be coached on how to run a Local Committee. ECM lasts for five days, offering working sessions and discussions about organizing events and cooperation on the international level. The meeting has around 50 participants. The first one happened in 2006 in Istanbul and the last one was held in Sarajevo, in 2015. ECM was succeeded by the Autumn Congress.

=== Congress ===
EESTEC has an annual meeting with approximately 110–150 Electrical Engineering and Computer Science students representing their local EESTEC group. It's the most important event in the year. Its main purpose is the discussion of current internal and external affairs, as well as the goals and plans for the upcoming year. An important part of the Congress is the election of the new board and bodies of the organization. Aside from the general meeting, workshops and training sessions are also held. Since 2016, the 1st Autumn Congress was held in Belgrade with an idea to more closely work on the education of members by providing as many working sessions. From 2017, when the first Spring Congress was organized in Ljubljana, Spring Congress was bigger Congress with the main part – the election of the new Board. The Board-in-Office would follow the work of the Board-Elect from Spring until the end of Autumn Congress.

==== Open Day ====
Since 2009 an important part of Congress has been the Open Day event. It's a fair where students represent their own city and give information on the Master and PhD study programs at their university. Companies have their own booth with information on jobs, internships, and technology, which they are offering.

== See also ==
- EUREL (Convention of National Associations of Electrical Engineers of Europe)
- IEEE (Institute of Electrical and Electronics Engineers)
- EURIELEC (European Association of Electrical Engineering Students)
