= EUREL =

Engineering society

EUREL Convention of National Associations of Electrical Engineers of Europe
- Established: 1972 (54 years ago)
- Founded at: Switzerland
- Type: Nonprofit, non-governmental organization
- Legal status: Active
- Headquarters: Brussels, Belgium
- Region served: Europe
- Official language: English
- Secretary General: Fabienne Dezutter
- Board of directors: Markus B. Jaeger (chairman); Marcel Stoeckli; Arkadiusz Jurczakiewicz
- Website: www.eurel.org

EUREL, the Convention of National Associations of Electrical, Electronic and Information Technology Engineers of Europe, is a nonprofit organization headquartered in Brussels, Belgium, composed of 12 national members associations in 11 countries in greater Europe.

EUREL was founded in Switzerland in 1972 as the Convention of National Societies of Electrical Engineers of Western Europe, and was later known as the Convention of National Associations of Electrical Engineers of Europe before adopting its present name, which reflects an expansion of scope beyond electrical engineering to electronics and information technology.

Its objectives are to facilitate the exchange of information and to foster a wider dissemination of scientific, technical and related knowledge relevant to electrical engineering as well as standardization in the field of electrical engineering. In this way EUREL contributes to the advancement of scientific and technical knowledge for the benefit of the profession and the public it serves.

EUREL also addresses the issues resulting from the current shortage of information and communications technology engineers (which is expected to reach an alarming level within the next years) by engaging with students and young professionals.

The secretary general's office, in Brussels, helps EUREL members position their expertise and connection to the European institutions. It also creates a bridge in between its members' associations who can exchange information about best practices and be inspired by their peers.

== Governance ==
As of 2026, EUREL's officers were:

=== Presidency ===
Role	Name	Member association
President	Mateu Oliver Montserrat	II, Spain
President-elect (2027–2028)	Michał Cichowicz	SEP, Poland
Past president (2025–2026)	Daniel Costianu	AIEE, Romania

=== Board of directors ===
Role	Name	Member association
Chairman	Markus B. Jaeger	VDE, Germany
Member	Marcel Stoeckli	Electrosuisse, Switzerland
Member	Zuzana Mielnik	SEP, Poland

=== Executive committee ===
Role	Name	Member association
Chairman	Marcel Stoeckli	Electrosuisse, Switzerland
Member	Markus B. Jaeger	VDE, Germany
Member	Zuzana Mielnik	SEP, Poland
Member	Daniel Herbst	OVE, Austria
Member	Virgil Popescu	AIEE, Romania
Member	Sergiu Hollinger	SEEEI, Israel

General secretariat: Fabienne Dezutter

== Membership ==
EUREL has always accepted only national electrical engineering organizations as its members, and has kept its supraorganization structure. Members of EUREL take part in the organization's international programs, enjoy the services of the office of EUREL's secretary general, and may take advantage of reciprocal benefits with other participating associations (e.g. events, discounts, and the use of libraries and conference rooms).

=== Founding members ===
The founding meeting was held on 24 November 1972 at the Zunfthaus zur Zimmerleuten in Zurich, where representatives of 18 national electrotechnical societies from 15 Western European countries gathered. Its purpose was to replace the bilateral contacts that had existed between the national societies with a standing framework for pan-European cooperation. Fifteen of those societies signed the convention at the meeting:

Country	Organization
Austria	OVE – Österreichischer Verband für Elektrotechnik
Belgium	AIM – Association des Ingénieurs de Montefiore
Belgium	SRBE – Société Royale Belge des Électriciens
Denmark	Association des Ingénieurs du Danemark
Finland	SIL – Societé Finlandaise des Ingénieurs Électriciens
France	SEE – Société des Électriciens, des Électroniciens et des Radioélectriciens
Italy	AEI – Associazione Elettrotecnica ed Elettronica Italiana
Netherlands	KIVI – Koninklijk Instituut van Ingenieurs
Norway	NEF – Norsk Elektroteknisk Forening
Spain	AEE – Asociación Electrotécnica Española
Sweden	SER – Svenska Elektroingenjörers Riksförening
Switzerland	SEV – Schweizerischer Elektrotechnischer Verein
United Kingdom	IEE – Institution of Electrical Engineers
United Kingdom	Institution of Electronic and Radio Engineers
West Germany	VDE – Verband Deutscher Elektrotechniker

=== Current members ===
EUREL accepts only national associations as members. As of 2026 the membership comprised thirteen associations:

Country	Association
Austria	OVE – Austrian Electrotechnical Association
Germany	VDE – Association for Electrical, Electronic & Information Technologies
Hungary	MEE – Hungarian Electrotechnical Association
Israel	SEEEI – Society of Electrical and Electronics Engineers in Israel
Poland	SEP – Association of Polish Electrical Engineers
Portugal	OE – Ordem dos Engenheiros
Romania	AIEE – Association of Energy and Electrical Engineers
Romania	SIER – Society of Power Engineers in Romania
Slovenia	EZS – Electrotechnical Association of Slovenia
Spain	IE – General Council of Official Chambers of Industrial Engineers
Sweden	SER – Swedish Society of Electrical and Computer Engineers
Switzerland	Electrosuisse – Association for Electrical Engineering, Power and Information Technologies
Northern Cyprus	KTMMOB EMO - Elektrik Mühendisleri Odasi*

*Associated member

== Young Engineers Panel ==
The Young Engineers Panel (YEP) is a EUREL working group composed of young representatives from our member associations. It represents the interests of students and young professionals in Europe. Their task is to liaise with each EUREL member association and support them in building up their students and young professional networks through European activities.

EUREL is committed to help young professionals and future engineers develop their skills and create a network that will help them in their career. It is essential to tackle the shortage of engineers, and this mission brings together all members. To achieve this mission a EUREL Young Engineers Panel was set up and is active in maintaining a network of young professional engineers and students.

=== Mission ===
- Coordinate the activities of students and young professionals in EUREL;
- Support the improvement of a multinational network for EUREL stakeholders;
- Gather and exchange scientific, technical and other relevant information among students and young professionals working in the field of electrical engineering or related fields.

== Events ==
- EUREL TOPSIM International Management Cup (IMC)
- EUREL Field Trip
- EUREL Future Technology Summit (EFTS)

== Programs ==
EUREL programs include project groups, professional events and specialized industry taskforces, as well as representation with the European Union. Some notable examples include:

- Photonic Electronic Integration
- Hidden Electronics
- Technological Sovereignty
- Electrical Power Vision 2040 For Europe
- Electrical Power Vision 2040 For EuropePart 2

== Objectives ==
According to EUREL, the organisation aims to contribute expertise from electrical, electronic and information technology engineers to European policy discussions on energy, climate and security. Its stated objective is to provide technical know-how to policymakers across Europe.

EUREL establishes the framework for stability in Europe. The first is to connect electrical, electronic and information technology engineers from young to old across Europe and beyond. The organisation facilitates an inspiring exchange and contributes specifically to sharing important approaches to solutions. Furthermore, EUREL provides know how and knowledge. The focus is especially on politics and authorities in Brussels. The expertise of the EUREL network can also be used in the member countries. EUREL wants to contribute to ensuring that political decisions are based on the latest facts and findings and that important technological topics receive the appropriate attention in politics and society.

== Challenges ==
A technologically united Europe is an absolute necessity. Only together Europe can master key issues such as:

- Technological sovereignty: From microchips to e-mobility to AI. Europe is facing extremely fierce competition. Beijing, for example, set their goal of technological world leadership years ago.
- Climate protection: We need more innovations for this common task. Europe's diversity – see the special expertise in hydropower in Northern Europe, solar technology on the Mediterranean and hydrogen in the heart of the continent – holds enormous potential.
- Resilience: More urgently than ever, Europe needs to strengthen its resilience, especially in the CRITIS sectors. Functioning power and communication networks, sufficient energy and secure supply chains must be ensured.
- Cyber security: Parliaments, public authorities and businesses are increasingly under attack. Cross-border alerts, common security strategies and shared security awareness in projects such as GAIA-X need to be organised.
- Trusted identity: Bots – whose photos, videos and conversations are deceptively real – are increasingly being used for manipulation. This creates a massive danger for democratic decision-making. Authentic pseudonyms, which are being established throughout Europe, offer a way out.
- Shortage of specialised personnel: There is a shortage of electrical, electronic and information technology engineers all over Europe. Professional associations, universities and education policy must finally find answers in cooperation instead of thinking in terms of national borders.

== See also ==
- IEEE (Institute of Electrical and Electronics Engineers)
- FEANI (European Federation of National Engineering Associations)
- EESTEC (Electrical Engineering Students' European Association)
- VDE e.V.
