= Non-governmental federation =

Federations which are not states or national governments

Many organizations that are not federal states are governed under a form of federalism. Typically they are organizations of organizations, that is supraorganizations.

Types of non-governmental federations include:

- International sports federation, a sports governing body
- Trades union federation
- Cooperative federation, a co-op of co-ops

== List ==
Notable non-governmental organizations, unions and other bodies called 'federations' include:

- International Federation of Red Cross and Red Crescent Societies
- Amnesty International
- World Wrestling Entertainment formerly known as World Wrestling Federation, a professional wrestling franchise
- International of Anarchist Federations
- International Organization for Standardization (ISO), previously known as the International Federation of the National Standardizing Associations (ISA)
- International Measurement Confederation, a metrology body
- International Federation for Human Rights
- American Federation of Teachers
- National Wildlife Federation in the USA
- International Lesbian, Gay, Bisexual, Trans and Intersex Association (ILGA)

== See also ==
- Organizational structure
- Category:Federations
- Category:Supraorganizations
