= Tampere Academic Symphony Orchestra =

Amateur symphony orchestra in Tampere, Finland

Tampereen akateeminen sinfoniaorkesteri (TASO, Tampere Academic Symphony Orchestra) is an amateur symphony orchestra in Tampere, Finland. It was founded in 2003 and provides a great opportunity for local university students - and others interested - to play in a full symphony orchestra. It consists of about 70 members - many of whom are students at the University of Tampere, Tampere University of Technology or Tampere University of Applied Sciences. TASO performs at least once every autumn and spring.

== History ==
The orchestra was first founded in 1998 as a string orchestra and it grew into a full symphony orchestra in 2003. Kimmo Tullila has been the conductor of the orchestra since the year 2000.
