= Tampere University =

University in Tampere, Finland

Coordinates: 61°29′39″N 23°46′41″E

- Finnish: Tampereen yliopisto
- Motto: Human Potential Unlimited
- Type: Public
- Established: January 1, 2019; 7 years ago (1925, original foundation)
- Affiliations: ECIU; UArctic; EUA; SEFI; SGroup; UNIMED
- Rector: Keijo Hämäläinen
- Academic staff: 4200 (2021)
- Students: 21,500 (2021)
- Location: Tampere, Finland
- Campus: Urban
- Colours: Violet
- Website: tuni.fi

Tampere University (Finnish: Tampereen yliopisto, shortened TAU) is a multidisclipinary public university located in the city of Tampere, Finland. It is the second largest university in the country by student enrollment.

The university was established on January 1, 2019, as a merger between the former University of Tampere and Tampere University of Technology. The new university is also the major shareholder of Tampere University of Applied Sciences.

== History ==
The University of Tampere was founded in 1925 as the Civic College in Helsinki teaching public administration, organisation management and journalism. In 1930, a total of 195 students were enrolled at the College and its name was amended to the School of Social Sciences. As the institution grew, it expanded to municipal administration, public law, child protection, and civic education. Faculty of Social Sciences was established in 1949 as the first faculty. By 1960, the number of students had increased to 933 and the School of Social Sciences moved to Tampere. The institution was renamed to the University of Tampere in 1966.

Tampere had been the most important industrial center in Finland since the late 19th century. Agathon Meurman, member of the senate of Finland, had expressed the need for a technical higher institution already in the mid-19th century. Yet, even after the Continuation War all technical higher education was conducted in Helsinki University of Technology. Urho Kekkonen, the President of Finland, signed an edict for establishing a Tampere-based branch of the Helsinki University of Technology in 1965. The school began operating on the same year. The branch gained independent university status in 1972 and was named as Tampere University of Technology.

The two universities always had close relations and co-operation was common in the fields of economics, computer science, biotechnology, and medical technology. Therefore, merging the universities had been suggested multiple times. The Tampere3 merger process began in 2014 when vuorineuvos Stig Gustavson invited the higher education institutions in Tampere to discuss a reform. In 2015, the three universities decided the objectives on creating the new university in Tampere. In 2016, the Ministry of Education and Culture appointed a steering, and a working group to prepare the establishment of a new foundation university. Initially, Tampere University of Applied Sciences was planned to merge into the new foundation, similarly to the other two universities. However, this would have required changes to legislation since Universities of Applied Sciences, or polytechnics, are not considered as Universities, in Finland, which can grant licentiate and doctorate degrees. The merger of the two universities was approved by the Finnish Parliament in December 2017 and came into effect on 1 January 2019. The university commune (TUNI) comprises the new Tampere University and the Tampere University of Applied Sciences, of which Tampere University is the major shareholder.

In 2021 it was announced that Tampere University is trying to get rid of a large part of its premises. The goal is to reduce farms by 25% by 2030. This includes closing the University Library. The announcement was met with protest from faculty staff and students as they felt that there is a lack of transparency in the design of this decision, and that their voices were not heard in the matter.

== Organisation ==
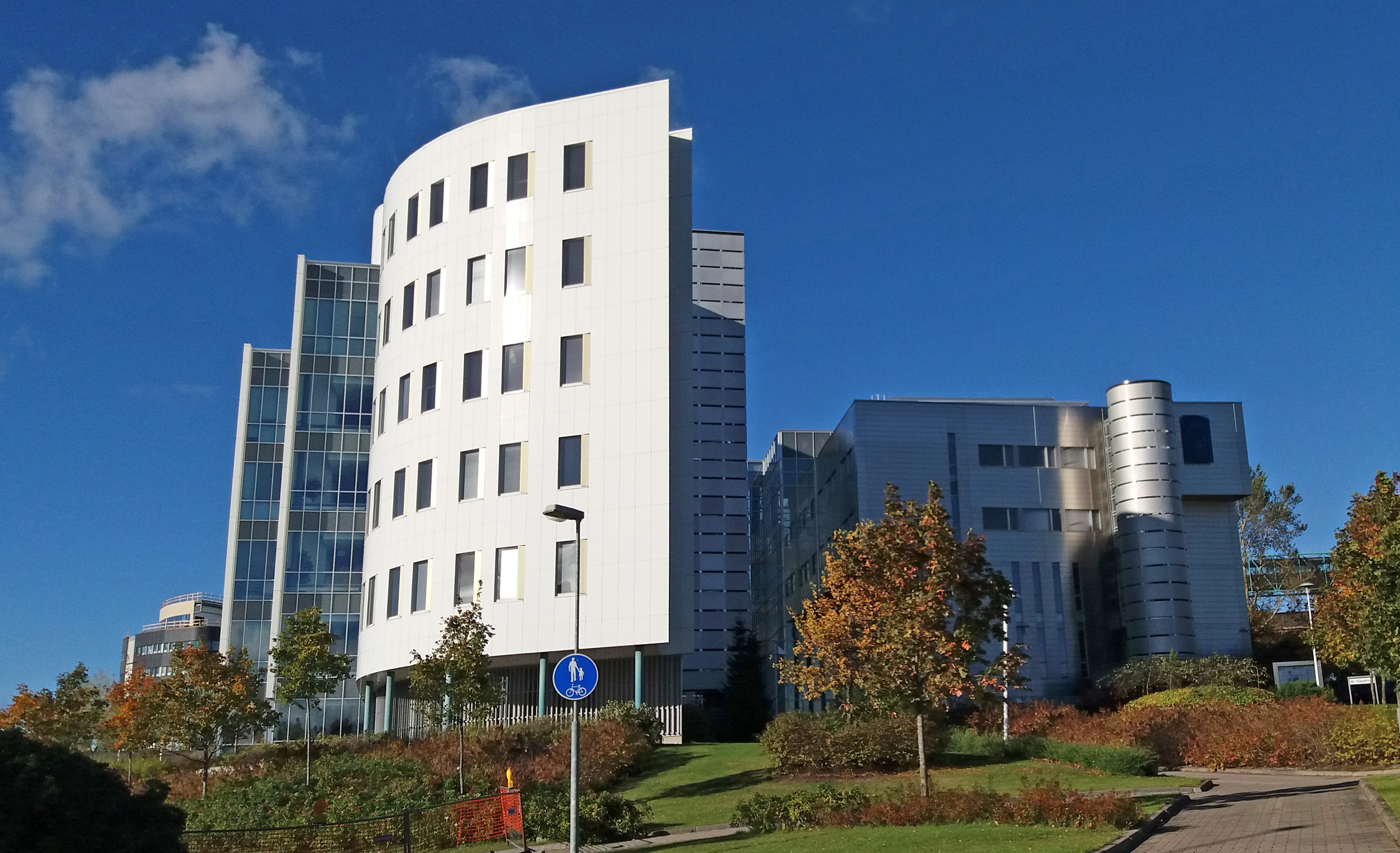
Central campus in Kalevanharju

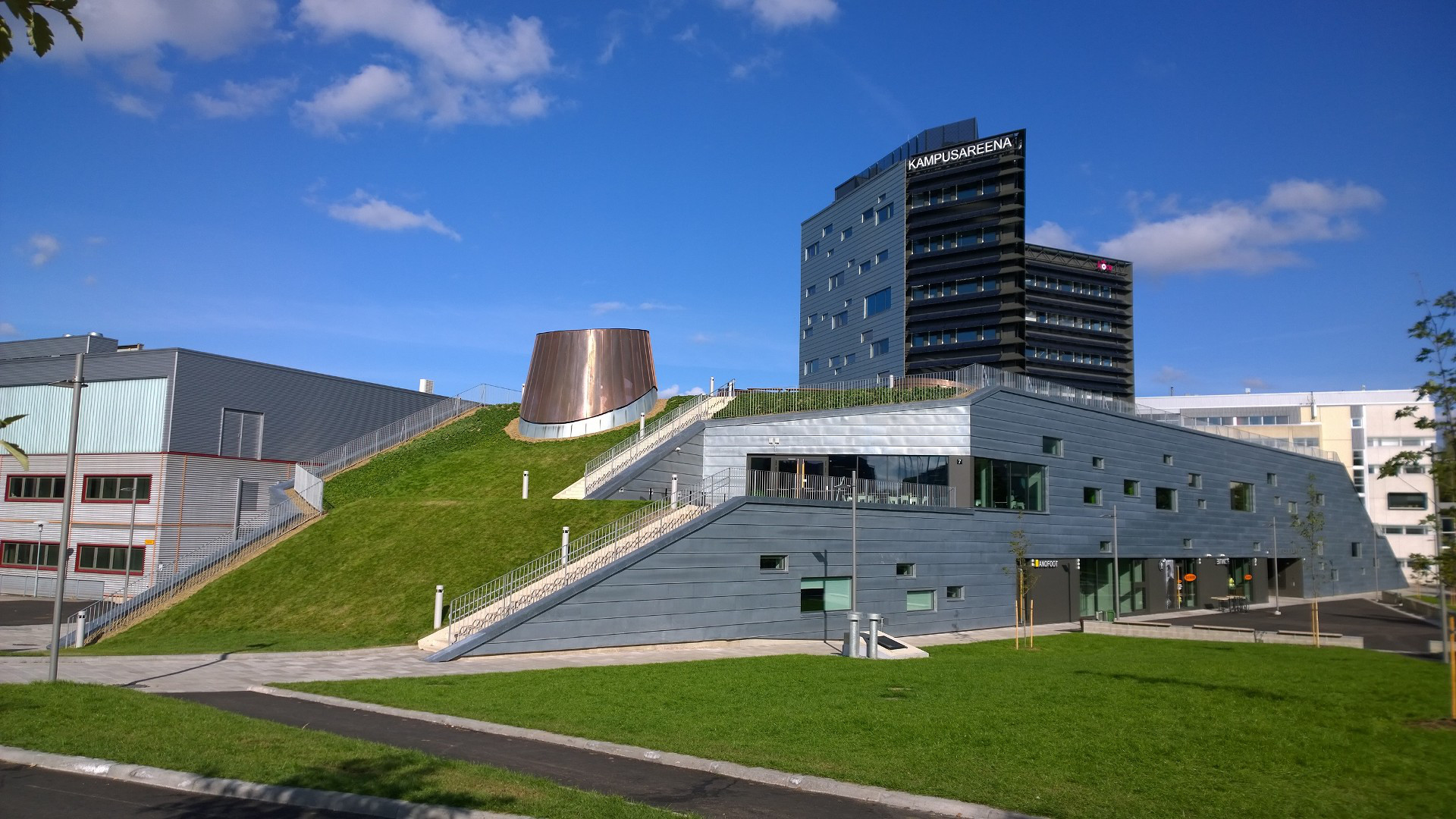
Campus in Hervanta

=== Faculties ===
Tampere University comprises the following faculties:

- Faculty of Information Technology and Communication Sciences
- Faculty of Management and Business
- Faculty of Education and Culture
- Faculty of Medicine and Health Technology
- Faculty of Built Environment
- Faculty of Engineering and Natural Sciences
- Faculty of Social Sciences

=== Other units ===
- Language Centre
- Library
- Teacher Training School
- Tampere University Hospital, a teaching hospital affiliated with Tampere University

== Academics ==
University rankings

Global – Overall
- ARWU World: 501–600 (2023)
- QS World: =423 (2026)
- THE World: 301–350 (2024)
- USNWR Global: =400 (2023)

=== Studies ===
A total of 21,500 degree students studied at the Tampere University in 2021, including 18,800 students in bachelor's and master's degree programmes, and 2,700 students in doctoral degree programmes. Additionally 1,600 students are completing medical specialty training. In 2019, the university received 28,265 applications of whom 2,977 were enrolled for an admission rate of 11%. During that same year, the university was the second most applied university in Finland only bested by the University of Helsinki.

=== Research ===
Tampere University is primarily a research university, whereas, Tampere University of Applied Sciences focuses on development. Pre-merger multidisciplinary collaboration was mainly conducted between the fields of signal processing, biotechnology and medical technology at the Institute of Biosciences and Medical Technology (BioMediTech). The University states that it aims to become a globally recognized research community in the areas of technology, health, and society research. The university has ten Finnish Centres of Excellence:

- HEX – History of Experience
- SPARG – Spaces of Political Agency
- Gamecult – Game Culture Studies
- AgeCare – Ageing and Care Research
- CoETG – Cancer Research
- FinMIT – Mitochondria, Metabolism and Disease Research
- CoEBoC – Body-on-Chip Research
- ProLipids – Biomembrane Research
- COMP – Computational Nanoscience Research
- Inverse Problems Research

The University also comprises a single Nordic Centre of Excellence:

- NordSTEVA – Security and Safety Research

Furthermore, the University coordinates Academy of Finland's flagship programme on Photonics Research and Innovation (PREIN).

== International collaboration ==
The university is an active member of the University of the Arctic. UArctic is an international cooperative network based in the Circumpolar Arctic region, consisting of more than 200 universities, colleges, and other organizations with an interest in promoting education and research in the Arctic region.

The university participates in UArctic's mobility program north2north. The aim of that program is to enable students of member institutions to study in different parts of the North.

== Notable people and alumni ==
- Hailemariam Desalegn – M.Sc. (Tech.), Prime Minister of Ethiopia
- Hille Korhonen – M.Sc. (Tech.), CEO of Nokian Tyres
- Jarmo Kekäläinen – M.Sc. (Econ.), general manager of the Columbus Blue Jackets
- Jouko Karvinen – M.Sc. (Tech.), CEO of Stora Enso
- Jyrki Katainen – M.Soc.Sc., Prime Minister of Finland
- Kalevi Sorsa – M.Soc.Sc., the longest-reigning Prime Minister of Finland
- Kari Jormakka – D.Phil., Architect
- Kari Neilimo – D.Sc. (Econ.), Vuorineuvos and former CEO of S Group
- Mariina Hallikainen – B.Sc. (Tech.), CEO of Colossal Order
- Matti Kähkönen – M.Sc. (Tech.), President and CEO of Metso
- Mika Lintilä – B.Sc. (Admin.), Minister of Finance of Finland
- Mikko Kaasalainen – D.Phil., Mathematician
- Paula Risikko – D.Sc. (Health Care), Minister of Interior of Finland
- Rainer Mahlamäki – M.Sc. (Arch.), Architect
- Sampo Terho – M.A. (History), Minister for European Affairs, Culture and Sports of Finland
- Sanna Marin – M.Sc. (Admin.), Prime Minister of Finland
- Satu Hassi – L.Sc. (Tech.), Minister of Environment of Finland
