= James Binney =

British astronomer (born 1950)

James J. Binney
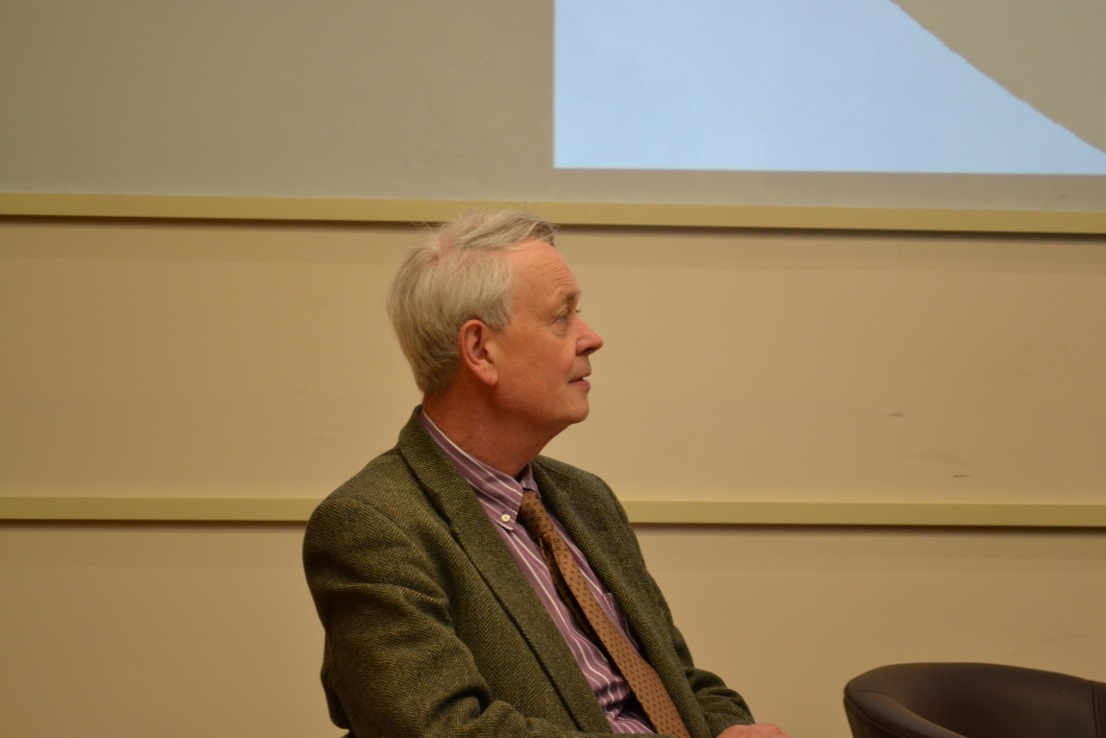
- Binney in 2013
- Born: 12 April 1950 (age 76); Surrey, UK
- Education: University of Cambridge (BA); Christ Church, Oxford (DPhil)
- Known for: Theoretical galactic and extragalactic astrophysics
- Awards: Maxwell Prize (1986); Brouwer Award (2003); IOP Dirac Medal (2010); Eddington Medal (2013); Institut d'astrophysique de Paris Medal (2013); Occhialini Medal (2015); Isaac Newton Medal (2023); Gold Medal of the Royal Astronomical Society (2025)
- Scientific career
- Fields: Astrophysics
- Workplaces: Institute for Advanced Study, Princeton; University of Oxford; Princeton University
- Thesis: On the Formation of Galaxies (1975)
- Doctoral advisor: Dennis Sciama
- Doctoral students: Brian Greene; Mikko Kaasalainen; John Magorrian
- Website: www2.physics.ox.ac.uk/contacts/people/binney

James Jeffrey Binney, FRS, FInstP (born 12 April 1950) is a British astrophysicist. He is a professor of physics at the University of Oxford and former head of the Sub-Department of Theoretical Physics as well as an Emeritus Fellow of Merton College. Binney is known principally for his work in theoretical galactic and extragalactic astrophysics, though he has made a number of contributions to areas outside of astrophysics as well.

== Education and career ==
Binney was educated at King's College School, Wimbledon, and then studied the Mathematical Tripos at Churchill College, Cambridge, graduating with a first in 1971. He then moved to the University of Oxford, reading for a D.Phil. at Christ Church under Dennis Sciama, which he completed in 1975. After holding several post-doctoral positions, including a junior research fellowship at Magdalen College, and a position at Princeton University, Binney returned to Oxford as a university lecturer and fellow and tutor in physics at Merton College in 1981. He was a visiting scholar at the Institute for Advanced Study, Princeton from 1983 to 1987 and again in the fall of 1989. He was subsequently made ad hominem reader in theoretical physics in 1991 and professor of physics in 1996.

Binney has received a number of awards and honours for his work, including the Maxwell Prize of the Institute of Physics in 1986, the Brouwer Award of the American Astronomical Society in 2003, the Dirac Medal of the Institute of Physics in 2010, the Eddington Medal in 2013, and the Isaac Newton Medal in 2023. He has been a fellow of the Royal Astronomical Society since 1973, and was made a Fellow of the Royal Society and a fellow of the Institute of Physics, both in 2000. In 2022, Binney was elected an International Member of the US National Academy of Sciences.

In 2025, Binney received the Royal Astronomical Society Gold Medal for Astronomy for his lifetime achievements in the study of the structure and evolution of galaxies.

== Interests ==
Binney's research interests have included:

- Physics of cooling flows and the processes of AGN feedback;
- Supernova disruption of galactic disk gas;
- Dynamics of galaxies, including those of the Milky Way;
- Galaxy and orbit modelling, including development of torus modelling techniques.

== Publications ==
Binney has authored over 200 articles in peer-reviewed journals and several textbooks, including Galactic Dynamics, long considered the standard work of reference in its field. Binney published a successor to Galactic Dynamics, Stellar Dynamics for Physicists, in 2026.

Books:

- Galactic Astronomy, by Dimitri Mihalas and James Binney, Freeman 1981.
- Galactic Dynamics, by James Binney and Scott Tremaine, Princeton University Press, 1988.
- The Theory of Critical Phenomena by J. J. Binney, N. J. Dowrick, A. J. Fisher & M. E. J. Newman, Oxford University Press, 1992.
- Galactic Astronomy (2nd ed.), by James Binney and Michael Merrifield, Princeton University Press, 1998.
- Galactic Dynamics (2nd ed.), by James Binney and Scott Tremaine, Princeton University Press, 2008.
- James Binney; David Skinner (2008). The Physics of Quantum Mechanics: An Introduction. Cappella Archive. ISBN 978-1902918488.
- The Physics of Quantum Mechanics by James Binney and David Skinner, Oxford University Press, 2013.
- Astrophysics: A Very Short Introduction, by James Binney, Oxford University Press, 2016.
- Entropy: A Very Short Introduction, by James Binney, Oxford University Press, 2025.
- Stellar Dynamics for Physicists, by James Binney, Kindle Direct Publishing, 2026.
- Stellar Dynamics: Problems with Solutions by James Binney, Kindle Direct Publishing, 2026.
