= Mikko Kaasalainen =

Finnish mathematician (1965–2020)

- Born: 1965
- Died: 12 April 2020 (aged 55); Helsinki, Finnland
- Spouse: Sanna Kaasalainen

Academic background
- Education: University of Oxford
- Thesis: On The Construction of Invariant Tori and Integrable Hamiltonians (1994)
- Doctoral advisor: James Binney

Academic work
- Discipline: Mathematics, Astrophysics
- Institutions: University of Tampere

Mikko K.J. Kaasalainen (1965 – 12 April 2020) was a Finnish applied mathematician and mathematical physicist. He was professor of mathematics at the department of mathematics at Tampere University of Technology. Kaasalainen mostly worked on inverse problems and their applications especially in astrophysics, as well as on dynamical systems.

He died after a long illness on 12 April 2020 in Helsinki, at the age of 55.

== Education and career ==
Kaasalainen received an MSc in theoretical physics at the University of Helsinki in 1990, moving shortly afterwards to Merton College, Oxford where he completed his DPhil in theoretical physics in 1994, supervised by James Binney. After a series of post-doctoral and senior positions in Europe, he moved to the University of Helsinki and to his present institute in 2009. He led a research group in the Finnish Centre of Excellence in Inverse Problems Research.

Kaasalainen was awarded the first Pertti Lindfors prize of the Finnish Inverse Problems Society in 2001. The asteroid 16007 Kaasalainen, discovered by ODAS in 1999, was named in his honour. The official naming citation was published by the Minor Planet Center on 7 January 2004 (M.P.C. 50463).

== Research ==
Kaasalainen's research interests mostly focused on mathematical modelling in various fields ranging from remote sensing and space research to planetary and galactic dynamics. Typically, the models and mathematical methods Kaasalainen developed with his colleagues are connected with inverse problems. Two such topics featured prominently in Kaasalainen's research:

- Asteroid lightcurve inversion, i.e., the reconstruction of the shapes and spin states of asteroids from their brightness measurements (lightcurves), based on mathematical results and uniqueness and stability theorems that have been transformed into modelling algorithms with which a multitude of otherwise unresolvable asteroids can now be mapped. This method has also been used in the direct verification of the Yarkovsky–O'Keefe–Radzievskii–Paddack effect in the Solar System.
- Analysis of large dynamical systems, where torus construction methods in phase space allow a compact representation or approximation of the dynamics of the observed system (such as a galaxy).
