= Gülsün Sağlamer =

Turkish academic

- Born: 1945 (age 80–81); Trabzon, Turkey
- Citizenship: Turkish
- Education: Istanbul University
- Spouse: Ahmet Sağlamer
- Awards: Honorary Fellowship by American Institute of Architects (AIA); Leonardo da Vinci Medal by Société Européenne Pour la Formation Ingénieurs
- Scientific career
- Fields: Architecture
- Workplaces: Istanbul

Gülsün Sağlamer (born in 1945) is a Turkish academic, the third female rector in Turkey.

== Life ==
Sağlamer was born in 1945 in Trabzon. After finishing primary and secondary education in her home city she obtained her MS from the School of Architecture in Istanbul Technical University (ITU). She carried out her post-doctoral studies at the Martin Centre, Department of Architecture- University of Cambridge, UK 1975-1976.

She returned to Istanbul. She became associate professor in 1978, and professor in 1988 in ITU. Between 1994-1995 she was the visiting professor in Queen's University Belfast in Northern Ireland.

Between 1996-2004, she was elected as the rector of Istanbul Technical University. She is the president of European Women Rectors Association. Between 2005-2009 she was elected to the board of European University Association (EUA). Later she was elected to the board of trustees in Kadir Has University and the president of the Council for Technology and Technoparks in Turkey She is a member of academic board of referees of the periodical Open House International.

She is one of the three Turkish women academics in the Oxford Book Women Scientists: Reflections, Challenges and Breaking Boundaries by Magdolna Hargittai.
