= Kari Jormakka =

Finnish architect

Kari Juhani Jormakka
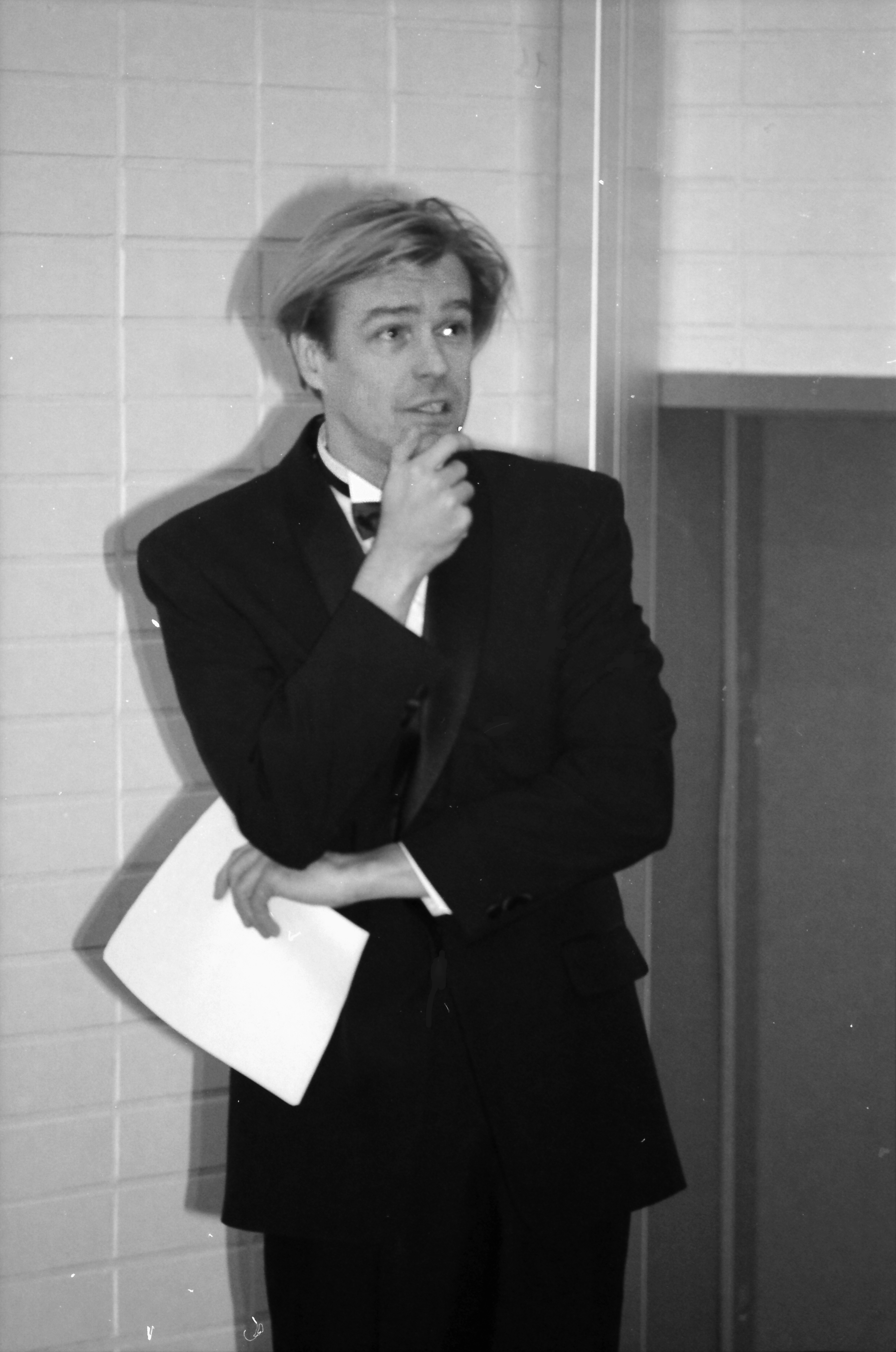
- Kari Jormakka, 1959-2013
- Born: January 21, 1959; Helsinki, Finland
- Died: January 13, 2013 (aged 53); Vienna, Austria
- Citizenship: Finnish
- Education: Helsinki University of Technology, Tampere University of Technology
- Occupations: Architect, historian, critic, pedagogue

Kari Juhani Jormakka (21 January 1959, in Helsinki – 13 January 2013, in Vienna) was a Finnish architect, historian, critic and pedagogue.

== Background ==
Though born in Helsinki, Kari Jormakka's family soon afterwards moved to the city of Lappeenranta, where he spent his childhood. After finishing school in Lappeenranta, he initially studied philosophy at the University of Helsinki before switching to studying architecture at Helsinki University of Technology, graduating in 1985. He completed a PhD in architecture theory, with a thesis titled "Constructing Architecture", at Tampere University of Technology in 1992.

Kari Jormakka's main theoretical position is characterized by studies in the ontology of architecture, defining the constructed nature of buildings as works of interpretation. As such a work may then be significantly determined by the period when it was created, a position that Jormakka critiqued through theories of Zeitgeist primarily associated with Friedrich Hegel and, in regard to modernist works, Arthur C. Danto. In "Eyes that do not see" (2011), the last published work during his lifetime, Jormakka applied these ideas to the theory of Functionalism best associated with the thinking of architect Le Corbusier and his fellow functionalists. At the time of his death Jormakka was Professor of Architecture Theory at Vienna University of Technology, Vienna, Austria. Previously he taught at the Bauhaus-Universität Weimar, University of Illinois at Chicago, and Ohio State University, and was a visiting professor at Harvard University.

In 2020 a Festschrift and Webfestschrift were published in honour of Kari Jormakka by the University of Tampere in Finland, titled "What, if anything, is a rabbit?", containing essays by over 20 of his former colleagues from the US, Finland, Germany and Austria.

== Select list of publications ==
- Eyes that do not see – Perspectives on functionalist architectural theory, Weimar: Verl. der Bauhaus-Universität 2011
- Wood with a Difference – Österreichische Studierende präsentieren finnische Architektur, Vienna: Luftschacht 2011 (eds. with Dörte Kuhlmann)
- Architecture in the Age of Empire / Die Architektur der neuen Weltordnung, Weimar: Verl. der Bauhaus-Universität 2011 (eds. with K. Faschingeder, N. Korrek, O. Pfeifer, G. Zimmermann)
- Building Designing Thinking, Helsinki: Alvar Aalto Foundation 2008 (eds. with Esa Laaksonen)
- Strategies of Tranparency / Strategien der Transparenz, UmBau 24, Salzburg: Pustet 2008 (eds. with Christian Kühn)
- Focus on Blur / Diffus im Fokus, UmBau 23, Salzburg: Pustet 2007 (eds. with Christian Kühn)
- Design Methods, Basel: Birkhäuser 2007
- The Art of the City – from Camillo Sitte to Today, Datutop 27, Tampere 2006
- Kunst des Städtebaus – Neue Perspektiven auf Camillo Sitte, Vienna: Böhlau 2005 (eds. with Klaus Semsroth and Bernhard Langer)
- Genius locomotionis, Vienna: Edition Selene 2005
- Competition! / Wettbewerb!, UmBau 22, Vienna: Edition Selene 2005 (eds. with Christian Kühn)
- Learning from Calvin Klein / Lernen von Calvin Klein, UmBau 21, Vienna: Edition Selene 2004 (eds. with Christian Kühn)
- Lost in Space, Wien: Edition Selene 2003 (with Dörte Kuhlmann)
- Geschichte der Architekturtheorie, Vienna: Edition Selene 2003
- Building Power – Architektur, Macht, Gender, Vienna: Edition Selene 2003 (eds. with Dörte Kuhlmann and Sonja Hnilica)
- Morality and Architecture / Moral und Architektur, UmBau 20, Vienna: Edition Selene 2003 (eds. with Christian Kühn)
- Flying Dutchmen – Motion in Architecture, Basel: Birkhäuser 2002
- Building Gender – Architektur und Geschlecht, Vienna: Edition Selene 2002 (eds. with Dörte Kuhlmann)
- Diagrams, Types, Algorithms / Diagramme, Typen, Algorythmen, UmBau 19, Vienna: Edition Selene 2002 (eds. with Christian Kühn)
- The Call of the New / Im Sog des Neuen, UmBau 18, Vienna: Edition Selene 2001 (eds. with Christian Kühn)
- The use and abuse of paper – Essays on Alvar Aalto, Datutop 20, Tampere 1999 (with Jaqueline Gergus and Douglas Graf)
- Form & Detail – Henry van de Veldes Bauhaus, Weimar: Verl. der Bauhaus-Universität 1998 (ed.)
- Heimlich Manoeuvres – Ritual in Architectural Form, Weimar: Verl. der Bauhaus-Universität 1995
- Constructing Architecture – Notes on Theory and Criticism in Architecture, Datutop 15, Tampere 1991
