= European Society for Engineering Education =

- Société Européenne pour la Formation des Ingénieurs
- Formation: 1973 in Brussels
- Headquarters: SEFI aisbl - Rue des Deux Eglises 39, 1000 Brussels
- Secretary General: Mrs. Klara Ferdova
- President: Dr. Balazs Nagy
- Website: https://www.sefi.be/

The European Society for Engineering Education an organisation for engineering education in Europe. Commonly known as SEFI, an acronym for its French name, Société Européenne pour la Formation des Ingénieurs, it is also known in German as the Europäische Gesellschaft für Ingenieur-Ausbildung. SEFI was founded in Brussels in 1973 and has more than 300 members in 40 countries. It promotes information exchange about current developments in the field of engineering education, between teachers, researchers and students in the various European countries.

Additionally, it develops the cooperation between higher engineering education institutions and promotes cooperation with industry, acting as a link between its members and other scientific and international bodies, in collaboration with other international organisations like its European sister organisation IGIP, the American Society for Engineering Education, and the Board of European Students of Technology.

== Members ==
SEFI is primarily a network of universities however, it offers four types of membership: individual, institutional (list), associate (list), and industrial (list)

Institutional - Educational institutions and other teaching establishments involved in the education and training of engineers.

Industrial - Enterprises, companies and administrations employing engineers or interested in the education and training of engineers.

Associate - Professional organizations involved in engineering education or improvement of engineering profession, or institutions not fulfilling the criteria of the institutional membership

Individual - Persons involved in the engineering education and the improvement of the engineering profession, and individuals interested in joining our Working groups or EEDC

== Organisation ==
SEFI is governed by a board of directors composed of 21 elected members and members’ representatives, two Vice-Presidents and is presently chaired by President Hannu-Matti Järvinen of Tampere University.

=== SEFI Special Interest Groups ===
SEFI Special Interest Groups connect the educators, students and industrial stakeholders with interests in similar aspects of the engineering education and they are open to SEFI members. These groups organize meetings, workshops, write on position papers and EU projects.

== Events ==
Workshops and are regularly organized by the working groups and committees on specific themes of engineering education and in the context of SEFI's priorities. Participation in the working groups is reserved to the members of SEFI.

=== Annual Conferences ===
The SEFI Annual Conferences represent an opportunity for the members and all those involved in Engineering Education to meet colleagues, exchange views and opinions and to establish new contacts. The themes of the Conferences reflect the interests of SEFI members.

Previous conferences were organised by Twente University in the Netherlands, and Budapest University of Technology and Economics in Hungary.

=== European Convention for Engineering Deans (ECED) ===
The general objective of the Conventions is to bring together Deans from whole over Europe to meet and to discuss in depth common topics, share experiences, identify solutions for problems and build up a network with peers in different European countries. SEFI launched the conventions in 2005, under the Presidency of Prof. Borri, University of Florence. Since 2011, ECEDs are organised annually by SEFI occasionally partnering with other organisations.

=== SEFI @ Work - online webinars ===
In 2021, SEFI started to offer regular online seminars for the engineering education community. These are dedicated to specific topics in engineering education.

== Publications ==
The European Journal of Engineering Education published by Taylor and Francis is the official scientific journal of SEFI.

SEFI also publishes a monthly electronic Newsletter and a weekly Press review as a benefit to SEFI membership.

Among regular publications are also SEFI Annual Report] and the Proceedings of SEFI Annual Conferences, indexed in Scopus.

Other publications consist of Ad Hoc Documents presenting the outcomes of seminars organised by the Working Groups/Committees/Projects as well as reference documents.

== Ongoing EU Projects ==
ENHANCE – European universities alliance

- ERASMUS +
- Coordination: University Politècnica de València
- Partners: SEFI, University Politècnica de València, Technische Universität Berlin, Warsaw University of Technology, Politecnico Milano 1863, RWTH Aachen University, Norwegian University of Science and Technology, Chalmers

CiSTEM² Cooperative InterdiSciplinary Teacher Education Model for Coaching Integrated STEM - Erasmus +

- 01/05/2021 – 30/04/2023
- Coordination: KU Leuven
- Partners: University College Nordjylland (DK), Obuda University (HU), University of Cyprus, SEFI

EuroTeQ Engineering Campus - European Universities Initiative

- Coordination: TU Munich
- Partners: Technical University of Denmark (DTU), École Polytechnique (L'X), Eindhoven University of Technology (TU/e), Technical University of Munich (TUM), Ecole polytechnique fédérale de Lausanne (EPFL) and the Technion – Israel Institute of Technology, Tallinn University of Technology (TalTech) and Czech Technical University in Prague (CTU).

== Awards ==
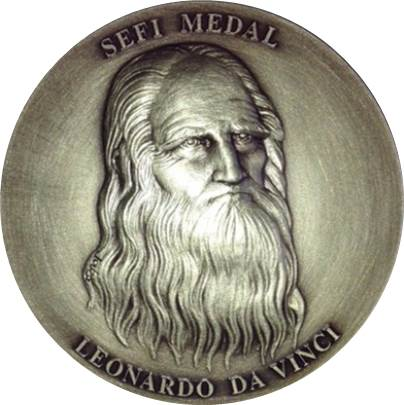
Leonardo da Vinci Medal

- Leonardo da Vinci Medal - The Leonardo da Vinci Medal is the highest distinction SEFI can bestow. The Medal is awarded by the Administrative Council to living persons who have made an outstanding contribution of international significance to engineering education. Since its institution in 1983, the Medal has been awarded to: Mr. Jacques Delors (France); Prof. Heinz Zemanek (Austria); Sir Monty Finniston † (United Kingdom); Prof. John P. Klus † (USA); Prof. Antonio Ruberti † (Italy); Prof. James C. I. Dooge † (Ireland); Prof Hubert Curien † (France); Sir Robert Telford † (United Kingdom); Mr Jean Gandois (France); Prof. Fritz Paschke (Austria);Prof. Olgierd C. Zienkiewicz † (United Kingdom, Poland); Prof. Teuvo Kalevi Kohonen (Finland); Prof. Niklaus Wirth (Switzerland); Senator Pierre Laffitte (France); Prof. Niels I. Meyer (Denmark); Mr. Santiago Calatrava (Spain, Switzerland); Prof. Joaquim A. Ribeiro Sarmento (Portugal); Prof. Giuliano Augusti (Italy); Prof. Gülsün Sağlamer (Turkey); Prof. Ingemar Ingemarsson (Sweden); Mr Paul Soros (Hungary); Prof. Ole Vinther (Denmark); Prof. Jean Michel (France); H.R.H. Prince Friso van Oranje-Nassau †(The Netherlands); in 2010, Prof. Dr. Konrad Osterwalder, Rector of the United Nations University (Switzerland); in 2011, Mr. Luiz Inácio Lula da Silva (former President of Brazil); in 2012, Prof. Joseph Sifakis (Greece/France); in 2013, Dr. Franck De Winne (Belgium); in 2014, Dame Julia King, Baroness Brown of Cambridge (United Kingdom); and in 2015 to Mr. Charles Champion (France), 2016 to Mr. Markku Markkula (Finland), 2017 to Prof. José Carlos Diogo Marques dos Santos (Portugal), in 2018 to Prof. Johan Malmqvist (Sweden), 2019 to Commissioner Tibor Navracsics (Hungary), in 2020 to Dr. Ruth Graham (United Kingdom) and, in 2021, to Günter Heitmann (Germany).
- The SEFI Fellowship Award - The SEFI Fellowship Award recognises meritorious service to engineering education in Europe. Award recipients may use the expression “Fellow of SEFI” (F.SEFI) as a postscript to their name. The nominees are in principle SEFI individual members who have worked in the field or in the promotion of engineering education for at least the previous five years.
- Best Papers Award - The Best Papers Award is given at the end of each Annual Conference to congratulate to the quality and originality of someone's work.
- SEFI Francesco Maffioli Award - The Award has been created to commemorate the 37 years of outstanding support and major contributions to the Society of the late Francesco Maffioli. The Award is given to individual teachers, or a team of teachers, of higher engineering education institutions members of SEFI, in recognition of open-minded development of curriculum, learning environments or tools, novel didactics, methods or systems in engineering studies. This is to reflect Professor Maffioli's passion for cooperation with engineering students and ensuring they had a voice in the development of engineering education in the future. So far it has been awarded in 2014 to the Board of European Students of Technology.; in 2018 to Prof. Ingvar Gustavsson from Blekinge Institute of Technology; in 2019 to Andre Baier for the Blue Engineering Initiative at TU Berlin; in 2020 to Ms Una Beagon and team – Creative Design Studio Framework – TU Dublin; and in 2021 to Gunter Bombaerts from TU Eindhoven.

== Cooperation ==
SEFI cooperates with other major European and international associations (ASEE, GEDC, IFEES, WFEO, IGIP, BEST, LACCEI, EDEN and JSEE) and international bodies (European Commission, UNESCO, Council of Europe, OECD). SEFI also participated in the creation of numerous international organisations such as ENAEE, IFEES, EuroPace, IACEE, IIDEA, or EEDC.
