= Supraorganization =

A supraorganization is an organization whose members or stakeholders are organizations rather than individuals and which performs an overarching function.

Some organizations may have membership of both organizations and individuals. These are usually described as "federations". "Coalitions", "networks", "confederations", and "unions" are also terms that are sometimes used, although these are just as frequently used to refer to organizations composed of individuals.

The term is also used in microbiology.

== See also ==
- Category:Supraorganizations
- Umbrella organization
