= Student society =

Organization operated by students for students, traditionally at a university

A student society, student association, university society, student club, university club, or student organization is a society or an organization, operated by students at a university, college, or other educational institution, whose membership typically consists only of students and/or alumni.

Early notable types of student societies include the medieval so-called nations of the University of Bologna and the University of Paris. Later Modern era examples include the Studentenverbindung in the German speaking world, as well as the evolvement of fraternal orders for students and Greek-letter student fraternities and sororities internationally.

Aims may involve practice and propagation of a certain professional hobby or to promote professional development or philanthropic causes. Examples of common societies found in most universities are a debate society, an international student society, a rock society, and student chapters of professional societies (e.g. the American Chemical Society). Not all societies are based around such a large area of interest and many universities also find themselves home to societies for many obscure hobbies such as a Neighbours society.

Student societies often have open membership, although some are invitation only including honor societies, secret societies, and certain traditional fraternities. Students typically join societies at the beginning of the school year when many societies present themselves in a societies fair and campaign to attract new members. The students may pay a membership fee to the society, while some may not. Since the societies are non-profit organizations this fee is often nominal and purely exists to cover insurance or to fund society events.

Student societies may or may not be affiliated with a university's students' union. Student societies often aim to facilitate a particular activity or promote a belief system, although some explicitly require nothing more than that a member is a present or former student. Additionally, some are not affiliated with a specific university or accept non-university students. Moreover, most student run organizations tend to depend heavily on collaborations with externals for their credibility and their success.

== Examples ==
Typical examples are:

- Civil Societies - encourage polite behaviour among people.
- Debating societies - organise and promote debates and/or oratory.
- Ethnic, national origin, or cultural organizations
- Faculty societies or Academic discipline societies - unite students from one university faculty, constituent college, or interrelated academic disciplines.
- Film societies - display and discuss films.
- Hiking clubs - organise hiking trips.
- International student societies - introduce international students to one another and promote international cooperation.
- Martial arts societies, such as Taekwondo and Karate
- Music societies
- Regional societies - unite students from the same region or hometown; a student nation.
- Religious Organizations and Communities
- Science fiction societies
- Student wing - a subsidiary, autonomous, or independently allied front of a larger organization that is formed in order to rally support from students and focus on student specific issues.
- Political organizations and Political parties
- Labour and Trade unions
- Advocacy groups
- Social clubs
- Professional association
- Greek-letter student fraternities and sororities
- Service organizations

== Student societies by location ==
=== Armenia ===
The Armenian National Students Association and the National Youth Council of Armenia are the two most prominent student societies in Armenia.

=== Australia ===
In Australia, student societies play an important role in university life by bringing together like-minded students to engage in activities the society seeks to promote.

=== Belgium ===
==== Flanders ====
In Flanders, student societies play a unique role in student life. Student societies there have traditionally been politically active, and they played a significant part in the 1960s division of the Catholic University of Leuven into separate Flemish and Walloon universities.

A student society in Flanders is led by a praesidium. The head of the praesidium (and the society) is the praeses. Alternative spellings are presidium and preses. For most positions, Dutch names are used nowadays.

Other positions include:

- vice-praeses: assists the praeses where needed.
- Quaestor: takes care of the money.
- Ab actis: the secretary of the student organisation.
- Cantor: Leads the cantus.
- Vertor: Organises cultural activities.
- Scriptor: Is responsible for creating a Magazine.
- Bacchus: Is responsible for alcoholic beverages. (Title taken from the Roman name for Dionysus)
- Dominus morum: Is responsible for keeping order at a cantus.

Positions are flexible, and change to meet the needs of the student organisation.

Student societies used to be politically engaged, but are now more focused on organizing parties, cantus, and cultural activities.

Student societies also exist at polytechnics.

New members go through an initiation ritual before becoming full members of a Flemish student society. A new member is called schacht and has to undergo a baptism. The baptism is the first step to integration in the student society. The next (and last) step to becoming a full-fledged member is the ontgroening. After the ontgroening, one becomes a normal member or commilito of the organization, and can join the praesidium if one so chooses. Normal members are also referred to as anciens.

==== Francophone Belgians ====
In Wallonia and Brussels, several types of francophone student societies exist:

- A cercle regroup students from the same faculty
- A regionale regroup students coming from the same location
- An ordre regroup students around some aspects of the student folklore or traditions. The most famous is arguably ANLO.
- A kot-à-projet (KAP) regroups students sharing the same passion for diversified projects : sports, arts, culture, sustainability or social issues...

These societies sometimes have traditions dating back a hundred years, such as wearing one of the two traditional student hats: the Penne or the Calotte. Their main activity is organising and attending parties or festivals (for example, the 24 hours bike ride of Louvain-la-Neuve or the St V).

=== Canada ===
The Alma Mater Society at Queen's University is the oldest such organization in Canada, and currently the most extensive in regard to student involvement. It is currently a multi-million corporation employing over 500 students. The day-to-day operations of the AMS are overseen by the AMS Council which includes an annually elected three-person executive (the President, vice-president (Operations) and vice-president (University Affairs), selected as a slate), five commissioners who are each responsible for a specific aspect of student life, and three directors who are responsible for overseeing the AMS’ 14 corporate services.

=== Denmark ===
Student organizations in Denmark are often interchangeable with the students' unions, as the local organizations at the universities are concerned about matters related to political interest and social activities. The political interests of the students are nationally represented by The National Union of Students in Denmark, which mandate is democratically given by the local organizations.

=== Estonia ===
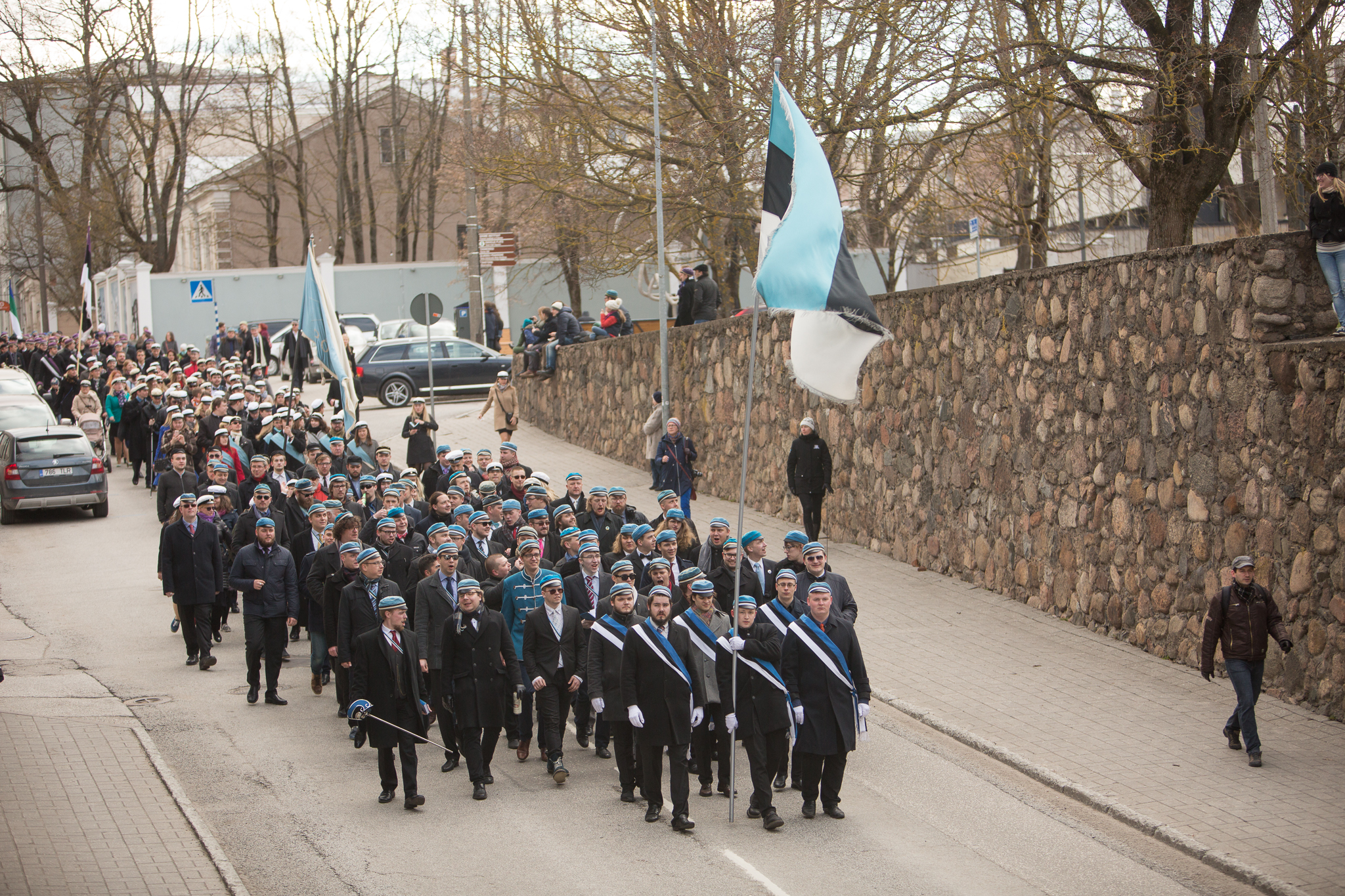
Walpurgis Night procession in Tartu (Estonia) led by Estonian Students' Society

Estonian Students' Society (Estonian: Eesti Üliõpilaste Selts commonly used acronym: EÜS) is the largest and oldest all-male academical student society in Estonia, which is similar to Baltic German student corporations (should not be confused with American college fraternities). It was founded in 1870 at the University of Tartu. It has over 900 members in Estonia and abroad.

In Estonia are 10 academical male student corporations. They are joined in League of Estonian Corporations, which was founded on March 28, 1915, by Vironia, Fraternitas Estica, Sakala, Ugala and Rotalia. Estonian student corporations have hundreds of members and alumni worldwide, because after the Soviet annexation of Estonia many members fled to Western countries.

Added to them there are one female student society: Estonian Women Students' Society, five female student corporations: Filiae Patriae, Indla, Lembela, Amicitia, Sororitas Estoniae.

=== European-wide ===
In Europe, there are several continent-wide student organisations fostering exchange among students of different nationalities and Culture, such as

- AEGEE – European Students Forum
- BEST – Board of European Students of Technology)
- EESTEC – Electrical Engineering Students' European Association
- EFPSA – European Federation of Psychology Students' Associations
- ELSA – European Law Students' Association
- EMSA – European Medical Students' Association
- ESN – Erasmus Student Network
- ESTIEM – European Students of Industrial Engineering & Management
- ESU – European Students' Union, the umbrella organisation of 44 national unions of students from 38 countries, representing over 15 million students
- EUGEN – European Geology Students Network
- JEF – Young European Federalists, a pan-European network promoting the idea of European integration
- OBESSU – Organising Bureau of European School Student Unions

There is also the National Unions of Students in Europe, a representative student organisation at European level, notably within the Bologna process.

=== Finland ===
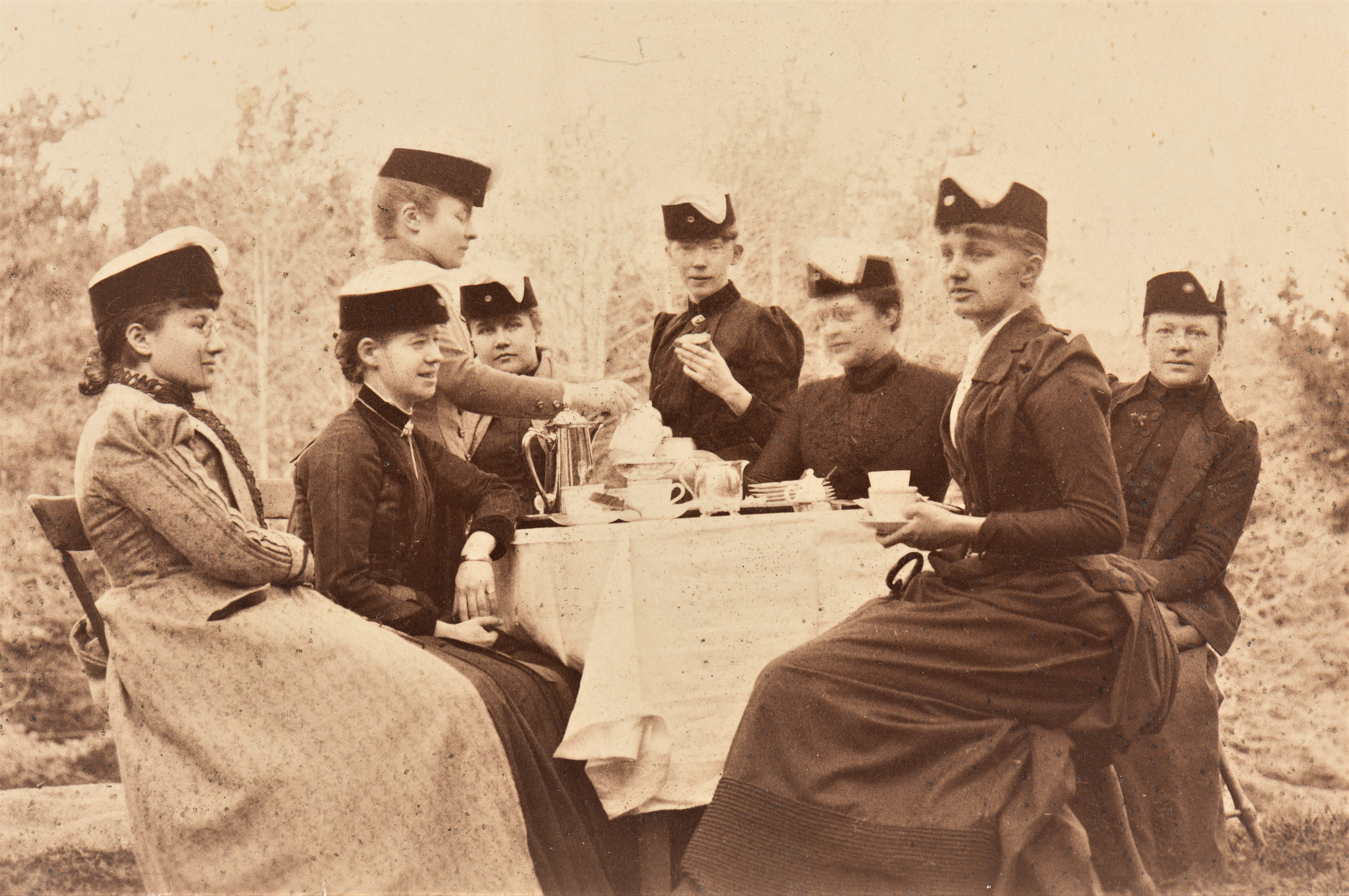
"De kvinliga", the group of the first female students of the University of Helsinki, in 1890

In Finland, there are many various student societies, ranging in variety based on education and ethnicity. By law all Finnish universities must have a statutory students' union and membership in these unions are often required for undergraduate students. The most well-known of these is the National Union of University Students in Finland, who aims at improving student conditions, with them representing around 135,000 students. All Universities of Applied Sciences must have a statutory student council and union, however membership in these are not mandatory. All student unions in the University of Applied Sciences are under the Umbrella Organization; Union of Finnish Student Unions. Among these, the traditional osakunta or student nations exist as well.

In secondary schools, high school students can join the Union of Upper Secondary School Students in Finland and both high school and vocational students can join the Finland's Swedish School Youth Association, which is made for Finland Swedes.

=== France ===
- AMGE-Caravane, (French: Association des Marocains aux Grandes Ecoles et aux Universités), dedicated to Moroccan students and alumni

=== Germany ===
In Germany, student societies are widespread and various, though by lack of support from the universities (and by force of variety), generally do not boast many members. The most popular are the Studentenverbindungen; most of them are moderate and tolerant, although many are restricted to male or Christian members.

On many universities - although in many states not officially recognised - there are student representations, called AStA (Allgemeiner Studenten-Ausschuss), StuVe (Studentische Vertretung) or StuRa (Studentenrat).

Other organisations include European Student Associations and the student organisations of the German political parties.

Yet, there are also politically and confessionally independent, interdisciplinary and not-for-profit student organisations. One of, if not the leading one in Germany is the Studentenforum im Tönissteiner Kreis e. V. (Student Forum within the Tönissteiner Kreis e. V.) that is part of a European and worldwide network of student organizations, the Politeia Community.

=== Indonesia ===
Student societies in Indonesia, such as Budi Utomo, have existed since before the Indonesian National Revolution of 1945. Afterwards, other associations, such as the Islamic Students of Indonesia (PII) and Muhammadiyah Student Association (IPM) were founded.

=== Iran ===
The Student Organization of Iran is a public and non-governmental organization affiliated to the Ministry of Education of Iran, which is a supplement to public education in the form of social education and started its activities on May 10, 1999. This organization is under the control of the Board of Trustees of the Student Organization, which consists of the officials of the Islamic Republic of Iran and the students of this country.

=== Ireland ===
Student societies are widespread in Ireland's universities, with a wide range of activities catered for, including debating, performing arts, role-play, faculty-based activities, gaming, political activity etc. The range of support for societies varies from university to university, though all universities provide funding and facilities to some extent for societies.

Student societies are usually governed by Officers and a Committee with an "Auditor" at its head. The Biological Society, RCSI's main student society, is purportedly the oldest student medical society in the world. However, it is Trinity College, Dublin which is the location of College Historical Society (1770), the oldest student society in the world. The Literary and Debating Society (NUI Galway) also has the distinction for being the first known student society in the world to elect a female leader, with the election of Clare F. Fitzgerald as "Auditor" in 1942.

=== Netherlands ===
In the Netherlands, there are different forms of student societies. Originally there was just the Corps (for corpus studiosorum), student bodies, starting with the Groninger Studenten Corps Vindicat atque Polit in the city of Groningen on 4 February 1815, as a part of the governing of the education on the universities and to give students the opportunity to develop themselves in all fields of life. On the wave of catholic emancipation starting in the 1890s, small groups of students, gathered around local priests, split off from the liberal, secular (in name anyway) corps fraternities to form their own societies focused on the catholic religion. This started the formation of many other religious societies in the different university cities. In the second half of the 20th century the Catholic split-offs formed an intercity-connection; the Aller Heiligen Convent and the focus on the religion was lost or abandoned.

These societies are now known as student associations in the Netherlands, aimed mostly at social relations and gezelligheid. Most of the corpora now reside in older buildings in the city center, retaining mostly a rather traditional and conservative image. These organizations offer students a wide range of sports, cultural activities ranging from all levels of sports like field hockey, rowing and rugby to extremes like kitesurfing, glider-flying, all for student-friendly prices and development aid organisations and encouragement to start a new club of some sort at all times.

The 20th century also saw, especially in the 1960s, the formation of more independent societies at the universities itself, partly as a reaction against the elite status of the corps, abolishing hazing and religious links and some even opening up to non-students. These non-Corps student societies are known as study associations (aimed at extracurricular activities for students, such as study trips, lectures, parties or drinks) or are general associations, for sports, literature, arts, etc., founded at the university itself.

=== Norway ===
The tradition with student societies in Norway reaches back to 1813, when Norwegian Students' Society in Oslo was founded. The major student societies in Norway are those in Oslo, Trondheim and Bergen. The societies in Oslo and Trondheim operates the student houses, and do also have subgroups who are engaged in theatre, political debates, radio, TV and newspaper. Bergen Student Society are not in charge of the city's student house, but are arranging political debates, lectures and cultural discussions at Det Akademiske Kvarter.

A Norwegian tradition is to appoint an animal as the high protector or majesty of the student societies, such as His Majesty the Golden Pig (Oslo), The Black Sheep (Trondheim) and His Majesty the Hedgehog (Bergen). The zoological Majesties have their own order of honours, awarded to members of the student societies and member of the academic staff at the institutions, as well as visiting members of the Norwegian royal family.

=== Sweden ===
Student leisure activities in Sweden are usually organised by the students' unions (studentkårer, studentkår in singular). Swedish student unions cover the whole area from arranging most of the big parties, cultural activities and sports event, to acting as an equivalent of trade union for the students so their voices can be heard regarding the content and forms of education. The union is usually divided in smaller parts called sections, sektioner, according to what subjects of programs the students study. Generally all kinds of smaller societies, political, religious or just dealing with different kinds of hobbies, are organised within the students' union rather than as separate units.

An exception to this are the two ancient universities in Uppsala and Lund. There, most activities except "trade union" issues are organised by the student nations, the oldest student societies in Sweden, now thirteen at each university. The Uppsala nations have a history stretching back to ca 1630–1640, and were likely formed under the influence of the Landsmannschaften in existence at the northern German universities frequented by Swedish students. The nations in Lund were formed at the time of the foundation of the university (1666) or shortly thereafter. The nations take the names from the Swedish provinces from which they traditionally recruited their members, but do not always adhere to the strict practice of limiting membership according to those principles.

=== Taiwan ===
Student societies exist not only in universities but are even required in high school. The curriculum guidelines of 12-year basic education mandates that Taiwanese high school students must receive at least 24 credits of group activities（社團活動） in one academic year. Most General senior high school students participate in two hours of group activities (社課) each week. This has encouraged the formation of well-supported rock societies (熱音社) and street dance societies (熱舞社). These student societies run themselves with minimal funds, traditionally hosting activities that require large amounts of labor and dedication; in return, committee members (幹部) are rewarded with academic commendations (嘉獎) or even minor merits (小功) from the school.

=== Uzbekistan ===
The first universities in Uzbekistan were established in the 1920s in the Turkestan Socialist Republic. Today many of these universities have their own student societies. These societies provide information and support for students who want to study in Tashkent.

=== United Kingdom ===
The UK universities boast many notable societies, most of them organised through the universities' Student Unions. These societies encompass a wide range of topics, from course-specific societies, sport societies, film or TV show societies and business societies.

Most bizarrely, this now includes a range of professional fraternities, namely Alpha Kappa Psi and Theta Tau, stemming from the University of Manchester from 2001, that take the form of a conventional student society, but with US fraternity norms and culture.

=== United States ===
Many student societies in the US are focused on the interests of the student members, whether it involves community service (such as the Feed The Families Club), the ethnicity of the members (such as a Black Student Union or Hillel), their religion (such as Chi Alpha Christian Fellowship) or lack of religion (such as the Secular Student Alliance), or their political interests (such as College Republicans or College Democrats). Others focus on a specific social cause (such as the Real Estate Club), whether by topic or specific to an area (even international). For example, Refresh Bolivia is a student-run nonprofit community which originated at Harvard University; it is dedicated to constructing a "maternal & child care oriented community health center" in Cochabamba, Bolivia.

=== Africa ===
Student societies in Africa focus on assisting students from junior high through senior high and universities. High Schools Society in Ghana focuses on establishing a student community for students through careers, networking and community service.

== International organizations ==
- AIESEC – Association internationale des étudiants en sciences économiques et commerciales (English: International Association of Students in Economics and Business)
- AMSA International – Asian Medical Students' Association International
- European Horizons – Transatlantic student-run think tank
- IAAS – International Association of Students in Agricultural and Related Sciences
- IADS – International Association of Dental Students
- IAESTE – The International Association for the Exchange of Students for Technical Experience
- IAPS – International Association of Physics Students
- IAPSS – International Association of Political Science Students
- IFMSA – International Federation of Medical Students' Associations
- IFSA – International Forestry Students' Association
- IFSA Network – International Finance Student Association
- IPSF – International Pharmaceutical Students' Federation
- IVSA – International Veterinary Students Association
- ISHA – International Students of History Association
- NACURH – National Association of College and University Residence Halls
- Oikos International – International Student-driven Organization for Sustainable Economics and Management
- SEDS – Students for the Exploration and Development of Space
- WOSY – World Organisation of Students and Youth

== See also ==
- College fraternities and sororities
- High school fraternities and sororities
- Honor society
- List of senior societies
- Studentenverbindung
