= International Students Association =

International Students Association may refer to one of several organisations:

- International Students Association, Saint Petersburg
- International Forestry Students' Association
- International Law Students Association
- International Students of History Association
- International Association for Political Science Students
- International Association of Physics Students
- International Association of Students in Agricultural and Related Sciences
