= IAAS =

IAAS can refer to the following:

== Organisations ==
- International Association for Astronomical Studies, a youth astronomy and aerospace research group based out of Denver, Colorado with a 40+ year history of success in the youth STEM fields.
- Incorporated Association of Architects and Surveyors, former name of the British professional body Association of Building Engineers
- International Association for Shell and Spatial Structures
- Institute of Agriculture and Animal Science, institute of Tribhuvan University, Nepal
- International Association of Students in Agricultural and Related Sciences, Belgium-based international organisation
- Independent Academies Assured Services

== Other ==
- Infrastructure as a service, a cloud computing service model
- Indian Audits and Accounts Service, an Indian Civil Service
