= Filip Šimetin Šegvić =

Croatian historian and teacher assistant

Filip Šimetin Šegvić (born 11 February 1986) is a Croatian historian and teaching assistant at the University of Zagreb's Faculty of Humanities and Social Sciences.

== Biography ==
Filip Šimetin Šegvić was born on February 11, 1986, in Zagreb, Croatia. He graduated from Classical Gymnasium in Zagreb.

He graduated history from the University of Zagreb. During his education he was awarded Rector's Award in 2007 and Franjo Marković Award. In 2012 he took the post-graduate study of the Modern and Contemporary Croatian History in European and World Context and is currently writing a thesis on cultural politics in Croatia-Slavonia during the reign of Count Károly Khuen-Héderváry.

== Career and work ==
Filip Šimetin Šegvić has published various scientific papers and articles regarding modern history in Croatian and international journals. In 2014 he authored the book Patriotizam i bunt: Franjo Josip I. u Zagrebu 1895. godine on the royal visit of Emperor Francis Joseph to Zagreb. He also co-edited and authored several booklets with interviews and articles of various international historians. He participated on numerous International conferences and round tables in Croatia and abroad (Austria, Czech Republic, Bosnia and Herzegovina).

From 2006 to 2014 he was editor and editor-in-chief (2009–2011) of the historical journal Pro tempore.

Šegvić specializes in 19th century history of Croatia, modern history of Austria and the history of the Habsburg monarchy especially founded on new cultural history, social history and intellectual history approaches. He is also researching on the history of historiography and theory. He is a member of the Centre for Comparative Historical and Intercultural Studies at the University of Zagreb.
