= European Geography Association =

European network of geography students & geographers

EGEA - European Geography Association
- Founded: 1987
- Founder: Students from the universities of Barcelona, Warszawa and Utrecht
- Type: Network for geography students and young geographers
- Location: Kraków, Poland
- Region served: Europe
- Website: www.egea.eu

The European Geography Association (EGEA) is an association encouraging European students to engage with geography through hands-on learning experiences. EGEA provides exchange programs and excursions to facilitate connection between European students and others from across the globe.

EGEA also provide publications in partnership with EuroGeography. They operate in 32 European nations and have over 3,000 active participants.

The aims of EGEA are to offer personal development opportunities to young geographers across Europe, and enable them to fulfill their potential as young scientists. EGEA provides complementary and alternative learning opportunities, beyond formal education of geography. This is done by encouraging and enabling involvement in intercultural interaction, as well as by development of academic, scientific, cultural and professional activities intended for young geographers on terms of equality, diversity and non-discrimination. EGEA actively contributes towards the promotion of geography through its network capabilities and through strategic partnerships, with the ultimate goal to strengthen geography's place in members’ local communities.

== History ==
The EGEA was founded in 1987 by students from universities in three main cities; Barcelona, Warszawa and Utrecht. The aim for the organisation was to allow students from varying European countries to exchange knowledge regarding the geography of the region. One year later, in 1988, EGEA was officially registered as a foundation with chair in Utrecht. In 1996 the first website of EGEA was launched. The homepage would become the central meeting point for all EGEA members across Europe.At the 2009 General Assembly in Heeg a change of EGEA's legal status was decided. Since then EGEA is working as an association. Until 2014 EGEA has grown from its initial three entities to a current number of 90 entities in 36 different countries.

== Activities ==
There are several local, national, and international activities organized by the entities of EGEA. The main events of the year are the congresses. Other annual events are national weekends and summer schools. In addition, entities organize their own events. The spectrum of content of these events reaches from scientific seminars or excursions to events where the main focus lies on getting together. A high popularity among EGEAns are exchanges between entities.

=== Congresses ===
Five congresses take place each year: four Regional Congresses in Spring, organized by one or more entities in each region, and the Annual Congress held in September.

Congresses always include workshops, excursions, trainings, and lectures with a scientific background. There are also meetings for Contact Persons of the entities and regional or international assemblies.

=== Exchanges ===
Students exchanges are the core activities of EGEA. They enable small groups from 2 or 3 EGEA entities to visit each other in their countries, learn about culture, explore local habits and experience that country's natural environment. Most importantly, they enable young geographers to get to know their international peers. Following the agreement, one entity is hosting the other one. During the hosting time young people take care of the accommodation, food, and programme. Later on, the hosting entity becomes the visiting one and repays the visit. Exchanges are numerously the most attended activities, when taking into consideration number of events taking place every year.

=== Scientific Symposium ===
Each year at the Annual Congress there is also a scientific symposium, where the members are able to present their scientific work, for example diploma or PhD theses.

=== Seminars ===
There are a few seminars every year, always organized by several entities. The seminars are held on a scientific level that cover different themes in the particular disciplines of geography.

=== Summer/Winter schools ===
During the semester breaks in summer and winter EGEA also gives students the chance to participate at self-organized summer or winter schools.

=== Weekend Activities ===
The national or international weekend activities are organized by the EGEA. In most cases there is a main theme to show particular regional or local characteristics. The programme can be scientific or have a more informal level. Some of the regional weekend activities, such as those in the Baltic states, the Slavic countries, Germany, the Benelux countries, the Iberian peninsula and the Balkans, are mainly aimed at people from that region, whereas other weekends are open to all EGEA members.

== Structure ==
EGEA was divided into four administrative regions: the North & Baltic, the Eastern, the Western and the Euro-Mediterranean regions until 2024. Now EGEA is divided to three regions: North & Baltic, Western and Eastern & Mediterranean regions. Every region elects a new Regional Contact Person each year. As helping hands they have one or more Regional Assistants. Together they form the Regional Teams. The function of Regional Contact Person was introduced in 2012 to relieve EGEA's board members of coordinating the regions.

=== Regions ===
==== North & Baltic Region ====
This region is located in Northern Europe around the Baltic Sea. Entities that belong there are situated in: Northern and Eastern Germany, Poland, Estonia, Finland, Iceland, Latvia, Lithuania, Denmark, Norway and Sweden. The countries in this region that currently don't have active entities are Denmark, Iceland and Latvia.

==== Western Region ====
By members and entities the Western Region is the largest administrative region of EGEA. It comprises the British Isles, the Netherlands, Belgium, Luxembourg, Western and Southern Germany, Switzerland, Austria and parts of France. The country in this region that currently doesn't have an active entity is Luxembourg.

==== Eastern & Mediterranean Region ====
This region contains all entities of countries that are located around the Mediterranean Sea and in Eastern Europe. There are entities in Bosnia and Herzegovina, Croatia, France, Italy, Serbia, Slovenia, Turkey, Armenia, Azerbaijan, Belarus, Bulgaria, the Czech Republic, Georgia, Hungary, Moldova, Romania, Russia (except for Kaliningrad and Saint Petersburg), Slovakia and Ukraine. The countries in this region that currently don't have active entities are Armenia, Azerbaijan, Belarus, Bulgaria, Georgia, Italy, Russia and Moldova.

=== Board of EGEA ===
The Board consists of six persons, four of whom fulfill the functions of President, Vice President, Secretary and Treasurer. These four board members are elected by the General Assembly out of individuals from the Association. A representative of the entity chosen to organise the Annual Congress was also a member of the board, but this latter position was replaced by an elected Event and Public Relations Advisor at the General Assembly of 2015. The Board represents and is the executive body of the Association. The Board is supported by the Secretariat Coordinator, previously called the Secretariat Director, whose seat is the office at the EGEA headquarters in Kraków. This position was first created in 2005 and contrived by the entity of Utrecht. It has now been moved to Kraków. In 2016 also the grant team with its coordinator was created to take care of financial grants.

Year	President	Vice President	Secretary	Treasurer	Event Advisor	PR Advisor	Secretariat Coordinator**
2026/27	Regina Univer	Karol Atys	Fiona Oberem	Anna Derzlein	Jonas Vilkaitis	Lotta Knorr	Maciej Szlachcic
2025/26	Klemen Baronik	Seline Daumal	Hannes Rottgardt	Olivia Deman	Job Stopar	Heli Türi	Paulina Wróblewska
2024/25	Julia Nejman	Luka Lešić	Michał Purta	Kristof Heimann	Céline Walker	Tabea Kottek	Jasper Oosterloo
2023/24	Runa Witte	Amalia Ilie	Lars Kohlmeyer	Jonas Martens	Max Buchhart	Veera Niemi	Raf Martens
2022/23	Henrik Stein	Josefa Loreth	Jared Young	Sigrid Paavle	Patrycja Sokołowska	Daniela Kebertová	Raf Martens

Year	President	Vice President	Secretary	Treasurer	Event and PR Advisor*	Secretariat Coordinator**
2021/22	Micol Alessandri	Esther de Winter	Marie Johanna Univer	Luana Schena	Stanisław Konieczny	Raf Martens
2020/21	Dylan Colonne	Rhune van Cleemput	Victoria Stoyanova	Alexander Basten	Daria Karsonova	Suzanne Lansbergen
2019/20	Ksenia Simonova	Jakub Růžička	Johanna Zempel	Jeroen Royer	Merli Ilves	Jelle Bulens
2018/19	Swen Schmitz	Valentina Vrhovec	Milan Mík	Frederike Schneider	Anna Feliksbrot	Albert-Jan van der Werp
2017/18	David Rabensteiner	Pietu Niinimäki	Lea Rebernik	Vít Volný	Anselm Eberl	Rick de Graaf
2016/17	Simon Schudel	Ines Stadler	Vilna Tyystjärvi	Joonas Pöllänen	Marek Borkowski	Rick de Graaf
2015/16	Daan Smekens	Florin Cioloboc	Maria Kolesnikova	Nina Wack	Michael Witte	Andries Bosma
2014/15	Nora Varga	Claudia Rock	Wendy Wuyts	André Berger	Robbert Kramer	Sander van der Klei
2013/14	Colette Caruana	Christoph Götz	Isabella Rojs	Alexandra Savulescu	Marius Vidac	Cecile Kerssemakers
2012/13	Jirka Konietzny	Niels Grootjans	Petronela Bordeianu	Maciej Radyno	Anna Toloczko	Rik de Kleijn
2011/12	Svetlana Samsonova	Joanna Wawrynowicz	Henning Kronen	Michael Poulsen	Kristel Sieprath	Sanne Heijt
2010/11	Alexandru Drăgan	Sven Vanderhaegen	Kaija Murasov	Mihovil Masic	Carolin Ziegler	Roos Saalbrink
2009/10	Claudia Iordache	Slobodan Cvetkovic	Milda Latakaite	Samantha van der Sluis	Catalina Ionita	Jelle Gulmans
2008/09	Jeroen van Pelt	Kamila Jankowska	Milena Karanović	Dennis Söderholm	Martinus Spoelstra	Lisette von Leijenhorst
2007/08	Aleš Oven	Vlad Dumitrescu	Kret Masik	David Jochum	Misha Lobanov	Malou Weber
2006/07	Heli Rekiranta	Alexandros Ziogas	Anastasia Kazakova	Tim van de Laar	Lukasz Jankowski	Gert Ruepert
2005/06	Alois Humor	Vojkan Gajovic	Anna Bieniasz	Sandor Kreuze	Florian Fischer	Gert Ruepert
2004/05	Vita Valuinaite	Igor Pilipenko	Rok Godec	Andrea Jordan	Leftheris Eleftheriadis	
2003/04	Leftheris Eleftheriadis	Natalia Krivenok	Kristjan Pärnamägi	Kathrin Klei	Gert Ruepert	
2002/03	Jean-François André	Joanna Markowska	Kristjan Pärnamägi	Heidi van Otten	Tomasz Dusza	
2001/02	Denis Ceric	Magdalena Bednarz	Erki Saluveer	Winneke Lobeek	Sylvain Rigollet	
2000/01	Sylvain Rigollet	Anna Tsukanova	Ann Ideon	Remco van der Hoogt	Wojtek Zalewski	
1999/2000	Vera Veranda	Magda Rak	Helle-Mai Pedastsaar	Sebastian Mosler	Primoz Pipan	
1998/99	Erika Eloranta	Primoz Pipan	Svetlana Malysheva	Dennis van der Avoort	Tonia Koops	
1997/98	Teresa Gomes	Piotr Strubel	Erika Eloranta	Dennis van der Avoort	Catrin Effe	
1996/97	Teresa Gomes	Mait Rei	Piotr Strubel	Henk Looijen	Nadia Dida	
1995/96	Catrin Effe	Sebastian Pichinski	Helder Santos	Rebecca Haacker	Ricardo Coutada	
1994/95	Ricardo Coutada	Ricardo Coutada	Maciej Dabski	Berend Bock	Monika Dittrich	
1993/94	Ricardo Coutada	Adam Sniadowski	Ingibjörg Bjornsdottir	Berend Bock	Tiit Tammaru	
1992/93	Jarna Karrila	Joanna Widy-Kwiatkowska	Jorge Humberto	Marije Willems	Xavier Munoz i Torrent	

- until 2012 Annual Congress Organiser, then until 2015 Annual Congress Coordinator.
  - until 2016 Secretariat Director

=== Regional Contact Persons ===
The Regional Contact Persons maintain the contact between the entities in their respective regions and the European Board. At the Annual Congress 2024, the Regional Restructuring went into effect, turning the previous four regions into three new regions.

Year	EAST & MEDITERRANEAN	NORTH & BALTIC	WEST
2026/27	Alexia Neașcu	Paul Stiebler	Timon Neels
2025/26	Tadej Kapun	Anna Nozderka	Maria Aulbach
2024/25	Klemen Baronik	Karolina Sentyrz-Kołodziej	Matthew Federico Becker

Year	EAST	EUROMED	NORTH & BALTIC	WEST
2023/24	Julia Nejman	Andrej Jovanović	Agnes Rosenberg	Lisa-Sophie Schwinge
2022/23	Ondřej Míka	Leon Puljević	Veera Niemi	Runa Witte
2021/22	Ľuboš Rybnikár	Mihaela Mladar	Jenni Honkanen	Henrik Stein
2020/21	Stanisław Konieczny	Micol Alessandri	Sigrid Paavle	Josefa Loreth
2019/20	Dorina Juhász	David Botko	Daria Karsonova	Anna Czerniejewska
2018/19	Yulia Kozak	Monika Gričnik	Beatričė Petkutė	Dylan Colonne
2017/18	Tetiana Stadnyk	Petar Božan	Ksenia Simonova	Swen Schmitz
2016/17	Petr Boucník	Lena Kropivšek	Ida Viinikka	Lorina Schudel
2015/16	Marek Borkowski	Vane Urh	Vilna Tyystjärvi	David Rabensteiner
2014/15	Maria Kolesnikova	Sergio Cuevas Pérez	Kseniya Gavrilova	Daan Smekens
2013/14	Nora Varga	Urban Furlan	Mariana Verdonen	Sascha Sabouhi
2012/13	Alexandra Savulescu	Colette Caruana	André Sæther Berger	Martijn Claes

=== Teams ===
EGEA has several teams (previously committees), carrying out important work to keep the association up and running. Currently the following teams are active within EGEA:

Media Team
Green Team
European Geographer (magazine)
Finance Team
Training Team
Science team
Inclusion Team
External Opportunities Team
Tech Team
Reach Beyond Team

== Partners ==
EGEA has several partnerships with organizations like EUROGEO, IAAS, ISHA, and Studyportals. Furthermore, there is a partnership to a program by the EU, "Youth in Action" as well as a partnership to a program by the Council of Europe, "European Youth Forum". There are also cooperations with ESRI, a supplier of GIS programs, and with the Utrecht University.
