= Anlo (disambiguation) =

The Anlo are a sub-group of the Ewe people.

Anlo may also refer to:

- Anlo (Ghana parliament constituency), constituency represented in the Parliament of Ghana
- ANLO, student corporation of the University of Louvain (UCLouvain)
