= Martyn Lyons =

British historian

Martyn Lyons FAHA (born 1946) is emeritus professor of history and European studies at the University of New South Wales, Australia. He is a specialist in the history of the book, Australian history and French history.

== Early life and education ==
Martyn Andrew Lyons was born in Westminster, the eldest of five siblings. His father, Edward Lyons (b. Leeds, 1920), of Polish Jewish ancestry, was an ophthalmologist who set up the first eye clinic at H.M. Stanley hospital in St. Asaph, Flintshire. His mother, Marian Spence (b. Elland, 1922), of Anglo-Scottish descent, was a nurse who became the first woman to be a Leader of a County Council (Clwyd) in the United Kingdom.

Lyons spent his infancy with his mother's relatives in Lancashire until 1950, when his father returned from active service in the Middle East, where he was a major in the medical corps. After his father was appointed to a consultancy in North Wales, he moved the family to Llanddulas in 1954 which became home for over 60 years.

Lyons was educated at Oriel House School, St. Asaph, and Epsom College, Surrey, before attending Jesus College, Oxford. He initially read Law but, after passing Moderations, decided to study history, graduating in 1968 with a Bachelor of Arts degree in Modern History, first class.

In 1968, he married Jacqueline James, with whom he had three daughters, Blaise, Holly and Claudine. They separated in 2001 and were divorced in 2004. Since 2005 he has been the partner of University of New South Wales colleague Mina Roces.

In 1968, Lyons embarked on doctoral research into the history of Toulouse during the French Revolution, under the supervision of Richard Cobb. He was a member of a small group of Oxford researchers (including Colin Lucas, Alan Forrest, Bill Edmonds, William Scott) developing a view of the French Revolution from its municipal and provincial grassroots. He received his D.Phil. in 1972. Cobb's influence can be detected throughout Lyons’ work even after he ceased to be a historian of the French Revolution. One reviewer found traces of ‘sansculottisme’ in Lyons’ history of reading and writing.

== Academic career and publications ==
In 1971, Lyons was appointed Junior Research Fellow at King's College, Cambridge, where he co-organised a seminar in French History with Tony Judt and represented the college at football and cricket. He published France under the Directory (1975), the first of three successful general histories of the revolutionary and post-revolutionary period.

In 1975, he became the Research Fellow in Arts at Durham University, where he published a version of his doctoral thesis, Revolution and Terror in Toulouse (1978). The French translation by Philippe Wolff was awarded the Prix Fayolle in 1981 by the Toulouse Académie des Jeux Floraux.

In 1977, finding it difficult to enter the academic job market in Britain, he emigrated to Australia with his young family to take up a Lectureship at the University of New South Wales, Sydney. Here he stayed, becoming Head of History (1991–94) and Associate Dean for Research and Postgraduates (2002–07), having been appointed full professor in 1998. He has been a Fellow of the Australian Academy of the Humanities since 1997. In 2003 he was awarded the Australian Commonwealth Medal for service to the humanities. He served as president of the Australian Historical Association (2008–2010) and was president of the organising committee for the 20th quinquennial International Congress of the Historical Sciences (CISH), which he had persuaded to convene at the University of New South Wales in 2005. He is a Patron of the Network of Concerned Historians.

He taught undergraduates at all levels in History and European Studies, designing successful courses notably on ‘Annales History and the History of Mentalities’ and on ‘Modern Italy since Napoleon’. He was regularly involved in inter-disciplinary team teaching, for instance in ‘Culture and Tradition’, taught with specialists in Politics, Sociology and Literary Studies.

He was one of the co-founders of the George Rudé Seminar in French History, which has met biennially in Australia or New Zealand since 1978. Lyons published Napoleon Bonaparte and the Legacy of the French Revolution (1994), commissioned by Macmillan UK, a general history which at the same time contributed to historical debates, followed by Post-Revolutionary Europe 1815-1856 (2006). This was the last of a trilogy which had begun with his book on the Directory, and which adopted a progressively pan-European perspective. The international scope of his work would become a hallmark.

In 1986, Lyons published The Totem and the Tricolour: a short history of New Caledonia since 1774, a work conceived as an antidote to what he perceived as distorted reporting of New Caledonia's political upheavals in the Australian press. The book was attacked both by pro-French colleagues and by supporters of the Kanak independence movement – a result he felt demonstrated his own even-handedness.

This foray into the Pacific had no sequel; Lyons had since 1977 become more interested in the history of the book, and after ten years’ research, he produced Le Triomphe du Livre: une histoire sociologique de la lecture dans la France du 19e siècle (1987), his first substantial monograph and perhaps his most influential, especially in its original ideas for calculating the bestsellers of the period. It was followed by another monograph on the history of reading in France, Readers and Society in 19th-Century France: Women, Workers, Peasants (2008), which contrasted normative works on reading with the experiences of actual readers.

During a highly productive sabbatical leave in Paris in 1984, Lyons had attended Roger Chartier’s seminar at the École des Hautes Études – a turning point which both validated his previous approaches and generated many new ideas for future research. One was the potential richness of oral histories of the reading experience. With Lucy Taksa he published the pioneering study in this field, Australian Readers Remember: an oral history (1992). Chartier had been instrumental in securing the publication of Le Triomphe du Livre, and it was at his invitation that Lyons contributed chapters to the Histoire de l'Edition française, tome 3: Le Temps des Editeurs du romantisme à la belle époque (1985), and to A History of Reading in the West (1995).

Lyons made his mark on the history of the book and of reading practices in Australia. In 1992, a group of scholars met at UNSW to discuss a national history of the book and of reading in Australia. The aim was to explore the history of the production, dissemination and reception of literary matter, and to provide a new and original account of the history of print culture in Australia. In 1995, Lyons was appointed Executive Editor of the HOBA (History of the Book in Australia) Project. In 2001, together with co-editor John Arnold, he piloted home the publication of the second volume of a planned three-volume series, A History of the Book in Australia, 1891-1945. Lyons contributed seven chapters as sole or co-author, and critics hailed the book as a landmark achievement.

Lyons’ work had turned from the history of book publication and distribution to the study of readers’ responses; he made a further shift into research on the writing practices of peasants and ordinary people. This line of inquiry produced several publications, including general books like A History of Reading and Writing in the Western World (2010) and collective works like Approaches to the History of Written Culture: A World Inscribed (edited with Rita Marquilhas, 2017). In addition, research into the history of ordinary writing led to The Writing Culture of Ordinary People in Europe, c.1860s-1920 (2013), a major monograph which led Lyons into archives in several countries, and in which he used material in four different languages other than English. He became an active member of SHARP (Society for the History of Reading, Authorship and Publishing) and served on its executive council (2015–19).

Lyons returned to the southwest of France, where he had originally served his apprenticeship as a researcher, to prepare The Pyrenees in the Modern Era: Reinventions of a Landscape, 1775-2012 (2018), but this time he embraced sources in Spanish (Castilian) and Catalan as well as in French.

Work on writing practices continued with a study of the impact of the typewriter (The Typewriter Century, 2021), and of correspondence to superiors, which Lyons labelled ‘Writing Upwards’ (Dear Prime Minister: Letters to Robert Menzies, 1949-1966, 2021).

Lyons mentored and sponsored several overseas-based scholars, and frequently translated their work gratis for publication, either from French or Spanish. He was a foundation co-editor of Lingua Franca, an electronic journal dedicated to the translation of work in book history originally published in languages other than English (2015–2021). Apart from western Europe and especially the Nordic countries, South America proved a receptive audience for Lyons’ work. Various books and articles of his were translated and published in Rio de Janeiro (Casa da Palavra & Telha), Buenos Aires (Ampersand) or Bogotá (Universidad del Rosario), and Lyons made invited lecturing visits to Brazil (1999, 2013), Colombia (2018) and Argentina (2018).

Overall, Lyons’ work is characterised by its substantial empirical foundation, and by the search for actual flesh-and-blood readers and writers. It shows a sensitivity to ordinary people's encounters with literacy and their experience of loss and separation. In the words of Roger Chartier, Lyons ‘recalls for us the importance of understanding the fragility of lives, the dreams or sufferings of men and women of the past, and the respect we have to pay to their dead souls.’

Lyons was awarded the 2023 Merewether Fellowship by the State Library of New South Wales. He will research "Reading in Nineteenth-Century Australia: the autobiographical sources".

== Selected publications ==
- Lyons M, 2025, The Uses of Literacy in Colonial Australia, Anthem, London
- Lyons M, 2025, A Modern History of Andorra: Autonomy in the Pyrenean Borderlands, Routledge, London
- Lyons M, (ed.), 2023, The common writer in modern history, Manchester University Press, Manchester.
- Lyons M, 2022, The History of Illiteracy in the Modern World since 1750, Palgrave-Macmillan, Cham.
- Lyons M, 2021, Dear Prime Minister: Letters to Robert Menzies, 1949-1966, UNSW Press, Sydney.
- Lyons M, 2021, The Typewriter Century: A Cultural History of Writing Practices, University of Toronto Press, Toronto.
- Lyons M, 2018, The Pyrenees in the Modern Era: Reinventions of a Landscape, 1775-2012, Bloomsbury, London.
- Lyons M; Marquilhas, R, (eds.), 2017, Approaches to the History of Written Culture: A World Inscribed, Springer, Cham.
- Lyons M, 2011, Books - A Living History, Thames and Hudson, London.
- Lyons M, 2010, A History of Reading and Writing in the Western World, Palgrave-Macmillan UK, Basingstoke UK.
- Lyons M, 2013, The Writing Culture of Ordinary People in Europe, c. 1860-1920, Cambridge University Press, Cambridge.
- Lyons M, 2008, Reading culture and writing practices in nineteenth-century France, University of Toronto Press, Toronto.
- Lyons M, (ed.), 2007, Ordinary Writings, Personal Narratives: Writing Practices in 19th and early 20th-century Europe, Peter Lang, Switzerland.
- Lyons M, 2006, Post-Revolutionary Europe, 1815-1856, 1, Palgrave Macmillan, Basingstoke UK.
- Lyons M; Russell P, (eds.), 2005, Australia`s History: themes and debates, 1, University of New South Wales Press, Sydney.
- Lyons M, 2001, Readers and society in nineteenth-century France: workers, women, peasants, Palgrave, Basingstoke UK.
- Lyons M; Arnold J, (eds.), 2001, A history of the book in Australia, 1891-1945: a national culture in a colonised market, 1st, Queensland University Press, St Lucia, Queensland.
- Lyons M; Leahy C, 1999, A Palavra impressa: historias da leitura no seculo XIX, Casa da Palavra, Rio de Janeiro.
- Aldrich R; Lyons M, (eds.), 1999, The Sphinx in the Tuileries and other essays in French History, University of Sydney, Sydney.
- Lyons M, 1994, Napoleon Bonaparte and the Legacy of the French Revolution, Palgrave-Macmillan, Basingstoke UK.
- Lyons M; Taksa L, 1992, Australian Readers Remember: an oral history of reading, 1890-1930, Oxford University Press, Melbourne.
- Lyons M, 1987, Le Triomphe du Livre: une histoire sociologique de la lecture dans la France du XIXe siecle, Promodis, Paris.
- Lyons M, 1986, The Totem and the Tricolour: A short history of New Caledonia since 1774, UNSW Press, Sydney.
- Lyons M, 1980, Revolution et Terreur a Toulouse, Privat, Toulouse.
- Lyons M, 1975, France under the Directory, Cambridge University Press, Cambridge UK.
