= European History Network =

The European History Network has run a number of projects under the banner of the Creating Links and Overviews for a New History Agenda (CLIOH) since 1988, including CLIOH, CLIOHnet and CLIOHnet2. Both CLIOHRES and CLIOH-WORLD are currently in operation as of December 2011. It was initially founded as the ECTS History Network, a pilot project of the ECTS.

== CLIOH-WORLD ==
CLIOH-WORLD is an International Academic Erasmus Network. It is supported by the European Commission, DG Education and Culture, under the Lifelong Learning Programme 2007–2013, for the period October 2008 to September 2011. It aims to increase critical understanding on the part of European students and citizens in general—of Europe's past, present and future and its role in the wider world. It offers a vision of an inclusive European citizenship and produces free educational materials and reflections for learners of all ages.

It builds on the efforts of previous European History Network projects (CLIOH, CLIOHnet, CLIOHnet2, CLIOHRES) to improve the understanding of national histories as they are studied, taught and learned in European universities. These projects have linked national historical narratives, and prepared tools and materials to structure history programs. These help make learners aware of how national historical viewpoints have been created, and how and why they may contrast with the beliefs and understandings about history in neighboring countries.

CLIOH-WORLD is using its consolidated experience and methodology to develop the learning and teaching of European Union history, including European integration and expansion, and to encourage awareness and understanding of the links between European history and the histories of other continents. CLIOH-WORLD has five working groups.

=== Working groups ===
==== 1. History of European Integration and of the European Union ====
Why is there a need for the History of EU and European Integration?

History is a tool not only used for the purpose of increasing knowledge of the human past, but also for enhancing the awareness and the identity of human social and political communities, of which the European Union is one. In order to achieve a better understanding of what the European Union is and what it means to be a European citizen it is essential to improve the knowledge and understanding of both the history of the European integration process and the history of the European Union itself. Universities are an important place where students can acquire such knowledge and awareness.

European Union History is not the same as the History of European Integration and vice versa: the two terms cover different aspects of European History. The main focus of the History of the European Union is on the history of European Integration, centered on institutional integration and the member states of the European Union.

The History of European Integration also covers aspects of integration that go beyond the European Union. Moreover, the sociopolitical schema in which the EU is conceived upon can be more holistically understood with insights observed before 1945 and World War II. One tool of analysis that history offers is 'historical perspective', the diachronic dimension that provides important insights into present-day phenomena. The understanding of long term aspects, events and processes, is also vital in building a critically aware European citizenship.

The task of the Working Group is to increase both knowledge and understanding of the European integration process and the history of the European Union. In order to reach such important goals the group has decided to map the current situation and to produce and disseminate Guidelines and Reference points for Higher Education programmes in Europe. The findings are offered freely as information, ideas and recommendations. The tools produced by the group can be adopted by or may simply inspire those who face the need to (re)design history programmes.

The Role of History of EU and European Integration on European Universities: the Mapping Results

The Working Group undertook an extensive survey of the current state of European Union and European Integration History learning and teaching, through detailed mapping of selected countries (Austria, Germany, Ireland, Italy, Portugal, Spain and the UK), and supplemented this with further sample-based mapping of other countries in Europe (Bulgaria, Cyprus, Finland, Malta, Romania) and beyond Europe (Japan). On this basis the Group feels confident that it has produced a reasonably representative basis on which to assess the field.

Although the mapping covered a broad and diverse range of countries and institutions, a number of common points were evident. In particular, it was striking that there is little learning/teaching specifically dedicated to the history of the European Union or European integration. Courses devoted to these subjects are overwhelmingly oriented towards political science, legal or linguistic studies. Where there was evidence of a historical approach to the subject it tended to be framed within either national histories (the relations between one state and the rest of Europe) or included in general histories of Europe, wherein the history of the EU and of European integration was treated either as a discrete part of the whole or implicitly (rather than explicitly) embedded in studies of post-1945 west European political and economic development.

The difficulty of identifying historical approaches to the subject underlined the problems of defining what that history is, however. There are a number of issues that make a neat definition of European Union history and the history of European integration problematic. These are principally chronological and thematic. If we seek to add a historical dimension to existing institutional studies of the European Union and of European integration, for example, questions arise about cultural and historical connections (what might be termed 'European-ness') which in turn open up problems of periodisation (specifically, whether an exclusively post-1945 focus is adequate, but if not how should the chronological parameters be defined?).

The importance of history in programmes of European Studies is in fact not pronounced, although history is often mentioned in the programme descriptions. Even where European Union history is reasonably well covered, it is usually as one optional module, a fact which raises issues about coherence, or the importance of thinking about what that History is. Although dealing with "Europe" is popular in European academic institutions and multiple universities and departments offer courses on "European history" or the history of European regions, an explicit focus on European History or the history of European integration is not widespread.

"European history" is often seen as history that happened in Europe or parts of it, not in a comparative way that contrasts or connects different structures and addresses the process of European integration. With these problems and questions in mind, it was possible to return to the original mapping results with a view to identifying 'interesting' practice that might illuminate some of these issues and how they had been addressed, and allow the Group to move towards a more meaningful interpretation of what constitutes European Union history and the history of European integration. It is these results that are to be used to inform the development of guidelines framed within the language and methodology of Tuning.

What can we learn from examples of good and interesting practice?

2.) Courses are seen as good and interesting practice if they cover European Union history and history of European integration in a way that goes beyond an institutional history of the European Union and its organisations. Some selected examples will illustrate these examples of good and interesting practice. At the beginning of the Masters programme "Sociology – European societies" (Freie Universität Berlin [DE]) there is a module that deals with "the process of political integration in Europe and the development of European societies after 1945".

The link between European integration and the development of societies broadens the horizon of the history of European integration. Critical views on the process of integration are also presented in a lecture series forming part of the Master of European Studies (MES) offered by the Europa-Universität Viadrina, Frankfurt on Oder (DE). What is interesting in this example is also the interior multi-disciplinary approach, also used in other courses such as "Interdisciplinary Analysis of EU" (in the "Integrated Studies of Europe" Programme, Universität Bremen [DE] ).

Here topics such as cultural pluralism and "European identity" or the transformation of the welfare state and "social Europe" are dealt with. The latter topic is the main focus of the Master in European Union Studies offered at Paris-Lodron Universität, Salzburg (AT). Here, courses on social and economic history in the longue durée (18th – 21st centuries) and courses that put EU integration in a pan-European and global framework can be seen as examples of good practice. That is also the case in a course on "Transnational History" at St Andrews (UK) that deals with the interconnections between European societies and non-European regions from the 18th century. That the history of integration after 1945 is very much affected by historical events that happened before 1945 is dealt with in a course on "European History since 1945" (University College, University of London [UK])

There particular attention is paid to the impact of experiences and memories of war, occupation, resistance and the holocaust in the period after 1945. Also the programme in European Studies (M.E.S.) at the University of Vienna, Austria, offers compulsory courses on "Plans for Europe in a historical context before 1945" and "Basics of European integration politics on a historical foundation". A comparative and transnational approach to the idea of Europe in a long durée perspective is pursued in the second cycle programme in "European Historical Studies2 at the University of Évora (Portugal).

Emphasis on the above-mentioned aspect of "European-ness" can be seen in several courses, such as "Culture and Identities in a Contested Continent" (Open University, UK). Here, Europe is defined as a contested and a dynamic space, rather than as a fixed geographical entity. Ideas and concepts of Europe are also part of the programmes on the European Union and European integration at the University of Coimbra (Portugal) that are mainly taught from a historical perspective.

The Faculty of Humanities (Letters) of the University of Coimbra emerges as an example of interesting practice due to the strong presence of the subject across a range of scopes and levels: from a single course unit on EU history compulsory for history students to first and second cycle programmes on European Studies where History is one of the five major fields of research. The University of Coimbra is – as one example – a member of a network of Universities that, with the support of the European Commission, organises a Master in European Studies: "The Process of Building Europe".

Good practice in EU and European Integration history

As the group mapped the situation and took a deeper look at examples of good and interesting practice, several factors emerged that – by integrating historical approaches – are useful for improving learning and teaching of European Union and European integration history:

1. Placing recent decades in a longue durée perspective, including history before 1945.
2. Dealing with aspects of European-ness (perceptions and representations, memory and history), hence with cultural and social history as well as with institutional history.
3. Analysing 'integration' as a complex process that comprises both integration and disintegration.
4. Adding a view of European history from outside Europe and analysing the links of European societies with non-European regions.
5. Adopting an inter and multi-disciplinary approach.
6. Offering joint programmes on the basis of cooperation between universities. These general findings can be elaborated and specified in terms of key competences seen as useful for students in programmes that deal with European Union and European integration history.

What should we know, understand and be able to do? Key Competences in EU-history and the History of European Integration

According to the Tuning Educational Structures in Europe project, the objective of single course modules and degree programmes is to develop "competences", in the broadest sense, in the learner. In substance the central element in organising the learning process is what the person involved will know, understand and be able to do at the end of it.

Attitude too, in this case the historical mind-set or approach, is fundamental. Using the Tuning results of the History Subject Area Group as a starting point, we have examined in depth a number of key competences to be developed in studies in the area of the History of the European Union and European Integration. These may be exemplified by the following:

A critical awareness of the relationship between current events in the EU and processes in the past and awareness of differences in historiographical outlooks in various periods and contexts

Learners should be aware that EU history does not start with European integration in the form of the European communities after 1945 and that processes and structures going further back than 1945 strongly influence the present situation in the EU and the perception of the EU by its inhabitants. Learners should be aware that current events are often seen through an inherited perspective that is historically based in national and regional frameworks.

Knowledge of the history of Europe is necessary to be able to interpret the different perceptions of current events in various European nations and regions. The knowledge that the learners should acquire in order to be aware of a relationship between current events and processes in the past is not primarily based on simple facts and dates but also on a knowledge of basic structures, the economic and social situation, demography, religion and political systems.

Learners should also be able to identify the role of national or regional myths and interpret the often "invented" significance of certain historical events in the context of the "identities" forged by European nations and their instrumental use and propagation in national/nationalistic historiography.

Ability to place events and structures in historical perspective

While a literal interpretation of European Union history – its institutional history / development since 1945 – can be reasonably easily defined and adds to legal and political science approaches, it is important that students also develop an appreciation of European history that predates World War II. Students should be able to demonstrate an understanding of the complex and contested historical origins of the European Union and be able to justify their chosen definition of what constitutes EU history.

This will require them to understand the complementary and divergent natures of specific (e.g. local or national) histories within the EU (to examine the EU as [more than] the sum of its parts) as well as external perspectives on the EU. They should, therefore, demonstrate an understanding of the multiplicity of EU histories defined both chronologically and geographically. By examining the internal and external histories of the EU, students will be able to define "EU history" and its place in world history.

Ability to define suitable research topics to contribute to historiographical knowledge and debate

The learner should be able to identify a number of significant studies relating to the history of European integration and cooperation during the 20th and the 21st centuries, including for example the concrete acts regarding it, the ideas surrounding it and the obstacles to it; to connect these works with the historical and political context in which they were produced; and to define the position of the author with respect to the historical, political, methodological and theoretical questions addressed.

The learner should be able, on this basis, to pose new questions for research having the potential to advance knowledge and debate, of a complexity appropriate to the level of study. The learner should be able to elaborate a research plan, organised around bibliography, documents and other sources (oral, written, material), as appropriate to address the questions posed and to revise (broaden, perfect) it in relation to his or her findings.

Ability to identify and utilise appropriate sources of information for a research project

The European Union is sometimes compared to an onion (as a sphere) with concentric layers. This is because it has a horizontal synchronic geographical segmentation and a diachronic vertical periodization. Learners need to acquire competences that allow them to distinguish, compare and analyse different periods and spaces of European and European Union history. This will require competences in finding, classifying and using critically sources of information appropriate to the historical time period, geographical space or phenomena analysed.

Students should have at least a basic knowledge of the methodology of related disciplines and an ability to use this interdisciplinary methodological arsenal (e.g. International Relations theories, security studies, comparative political sociology and political science theory). Learners should be able to combine sources of different kinds (e.g. treaties, European Union law, the acquis communitaire [the body of EU law established until now], audiovisual materials, press releases, discourses, political programmes) and forms (written, electronic sources, official sites of EU administration), address them with critical awareness and analyse them in the appropriate historical, national, international or EU community context.

Interdisciplinarity

The learner should be aware of and able to use tools of other human sciences as well as those of the various branches of historical research. This entails understanding that different kinds of history (e.g. economic, political, intellectual, cultural, social, institutional, legal, diplomatic, gender and religious history; history of international relations) as well as other human sciences (anthropology, literary criticism, history of language, art history, archaeology, law, sociology, philosophy) are indispensable tools for creating a critical awareness of the relationship between current events related to EU history and the processes of the past, a critical point in student competences.

Moreover, the learner should understand and be critically aware that a number of these different branches of history or human sciences may offer a specific focused viewpoint for analyzing the history of the EU in a more profound way. This kind of perspective allows the learner to perceive the differences between the various approaches to EU history and to European history in a broader sense, fostering critical awareness of the way multiple political discourses are founded on a specific historical view of Europe and its history.

In fact, a number of different approaches may be used, both in studying the European Union, and in studying European History, but not all of them are equally correct in terms of historical analysis and methodology: some are functional to particular political points of view and based on revisionist or nationalist perspectives. The history of the European Union is more than the sum of the histories of multiple different countries plus the history of the European Union itself. The EU, just like European citizenship and European identity, can be considered multi-layered or stratified. It is a complex system and requires a multi-faceted approach.

Members: Ewald Hiebl (University of Salzburg, AT), Luísa Trindade (University of Coimbra, PT) (co-leaders); David Brown (Strathclyde University, Glasgow, UK), Attila G. Hunyadi (University of Babeş-Bolyai, Cluj, RO), Ann Katherine Isaacs (University of Pisa, IT), Manfredi Merluzzi (Rome3 University, IT), Amélia Andrade (University Nova of Lisbon, PT), Ausma Cimdiņa (University of Latvia, LV), Blanka Říchová (Charles University, Prague, CZ).

==== 3. E-learning and Digitisation ====
The arrival of the digital age has influenced both the study of history and its method of instruction. Developments in digitization and e- learning have expanded access to historical resources and introduced new approaches to research and education. At the same time, these developments present challenges related to the management, evaluation, and interpretation of larger volumes of digital information. As a discipline, history relies of established methods, including source criticism, to evaluate and validate the information obtained through digital technologies.

Interest in making archival materials and collections available has therefore been widely spread among historians. There are a number of university-based projects to digitise collections of archival materials, history journals are well represented in scholarly on- line source collections such as Project MUSE and JSTOR, and discussion forums are a regular feature of history modules. The value of such developments for the scholar and student of history are evident.

Digital collections reduce the need to travel to archives, search engines enable relevant material to be found more quickly, the availability of materials online reduces the pressure on paper resources in the library and enable more students to use the same materials simultaneously, and, lastly, e-learning tools provide the opportunity to extend the contact time between teachers and students, and amongst students themselves. E-learning also opens up apparently limitless possibilities for distance learning, allowing students across the globe to learn together online.

There are of course a number of problems associated with digitization and e-learning that have yet to be resolved or that must, at least, be acknowledged alongside the opportunities opened up. Digitization has proceeded unevenly, with, for example, a disproportionate representation of English-language materials, and it often reflects the same biases to be found in more traditional collections of materials: thus men tend to be more visible as historical protagonists than women.

Search engines can limit the unwary scholar to a narrow gaze, only identifying those documents which contain particular terms, while missing others with a more subtle relevance to a particular question, and plucking journal articles and primary materials from their context. In terms of e-learning, teachers and students have both expressed concerns about the extent to which online interaction compares favourably with a more traditional lesson in a classroom.

The Importance of Digitization and e-Learning to CLIOHWORLD Project

The importance of engaging with the digital world has been understood by all the CLIOH projects, not least the current CLIOHWORLD. CLIOHWORLD maintains a website to facilitate communication with its members, and also to reach out to a much wider audience of scholars, teachers and students of history. Central to the CLIOHWORLD project is the dissemination of learning materials.

The project has already pioneered making available electronically resources for teaching which represent the latest scholarship on a number of key topics related to thematic and national histories. CLIOHWORLD's current focus is on improving European citizens' understanding of their own history, especially the history of integration, while placing Europe in a global context. It is not surprising that in order to achieve this, several of the working groups on the project have produced readers and online teaching guides dedicated to their particular fields, and that more are in preparation.

Tasks of the Working Group on Digitization

The tasks of the Working Group are threefold: to increase the visibility of CLIOHWORLD online; to map the current use of digital and e-learning resources for teaching purposes in universities; and to produce a report which explores the opportunities and challenges related to recent developments in digitization and e-learning.

(1) Increasing visibility of CLIOHWORLD and associated projects

The Working Group has prioritized enhancing the visibility of CLIOHWORLD and its partner organization, CLIOHRES. To support this initiative, we have established a presence on Wikipedia and launched a dedicated CLIOHWORLD Facebook page to facilitate broader community engagement.

It is particularly appropriate that CLIOHWORLD should be found on both these sites, for it ties in with the project's aims to reach out across the continent, and now globally, to promote a critical understanding of European history, and to disseminate teaching materials to help learners of all ages study this topic. Links to the considerable resources on European history already available on the CLIOHWORLD website have been included on both pages. As mentioned above, a number of the other Working Groups of CLIOHWORLD expect to produce online resources related to their particular themes and links to these can be added as appropriate to Wikipedia and Facebook.

(2) Mapping the current use of digital and e-learning resources for teaching purposes in universities

It is easy to assume that engagement with digital and e-learning resources is universal and at the same level, yet multiple universities, and departments within them, are at different stages of taking advantage of the opportunities such resources offer. The Working Group is mapping the use of digital and e-learning resources in the universities of CLIOHWORLD partners using an online survey. We hope to identify what digital resources are being used by individuals and their colleagues to support their teaching; get a sense of the way in which e-learning tools are being utilised to facilitate and enhance student experience; and explore the extent to which such endeavours are supported at a departmental, faculty and institutional level.

The last issue addressed in the questionnaire is the challenges faced by teachers in making use of digital resources and e-learning tools. It is often assumed, for example, that young people are automatically computer literate and skilled in the use of search engines and digital resources, but it is often the case that they require training and support. Tied closely with this is our final question which addresses the issue of competencies.

The Tuning project has identified a number of key competencies which students of history can be expected to demonstrate. Three competences are related to the use of digital and e-learning resources: knowledge of and ability to use information retrieval tools, such as e-references; ability to use computer and internet resources for elaborating historical or related data; and ability to identify and utilise appropriately sources of information for research projects. We hope to identify the extent to which the competences listed are sufficient to enable a student to use digital materials and e-learning tools.

Our initial results suggest that considerable numbers of university lecturers are making use of some digital resources and e-learning tools, but that not all resources available are used equally. Thus databases of sources are more popular than YouTube videos, and e-learning platforms are used more often than wikis and blogs. Some expressed concerns about the limited nature of training available to staff, which helps explain the disproportionate use of the least challenging digital and e-learning resources. The results from this questionnaire will feed into our third output which is a report.

(3) Information gathering on digitization and e-learning

The field of digitization and e-learning is fast-moving and Working Group 3 aims to keep CLIOHWORLD abreast of those changes, as well as produce materials that can be used a guide for scholars, teachers and students. Thus, the group is working on a report which builds on and updates the research it conducted for CLIOHnet 2 and explores new developments in digitization and e-learning resources. Three main areas for further research have been identified:

(a) Researching history

Digital resources have changed research practices and the use of historical sources. Comparisons between printed and digital formats have been used to examine the characteristics and limitations of each medium. The increasing use of digital research tools, including Zotero, has contributed to the study of their role in historical research.

Such tools are designed to facilitate the building of international virtual research groups and to enhance the individual researcher's experience of online research. Questions remain, however, around the extent to which such tools improve scholarly enquiry. Do such tools represent a threat to the traditional historical skills associated with archival research? Similarly, the proliferation of online resources is changing the nature and role of archives and libraries, and it is useful to consider the consequences of these developments.

(b) Publishing history

Just as digitization is changing the nature of the archiving of primary materials, it is also influencing the publication of secondary materials. Journals are published online as a matter of course and projects to digitise books are underway in a number of guises. While online journals are extremely popular amongst scholars, there is perhaps still some resistance to reading books online or using the new electronic book readers like Kindle. Other new methods for publishing historical material like Drupal, WordPress and so on also need to be discussed, for they raise wider questions about the effect of open-access publishing and the barriers to achieving this.

(c) Teaching history

Digital resources and e-learning tools have the potential to enhance teaching. Digital resources relieve pressure on more traditional sources and make available to students previously inaccessible documents and materials. Where digital resources are concerned, however, it is vital that teachers of history also equip students to deal with the challenges they pose. The, at times, lax checks and balances which govern online publishing mean that the unwary may use unreliable or poor quality materials in the place of more scholarly resources.

Universities are also increasingly aware of the opportunities for expanding their reach and recruitment using e-learning tools, with lectures being posted on YouTube and online courses being developed to enable distance learning. Even social networking sites like Facebook and virtual worlds like Second Life are proving to be of use to educational institutions, facilitating communication and, in the latter case, enabling the recreation of artefacts, battlegrounds and even cities of the past.

The Working Group has interviewed one teacher of history on her experiences of using Second Life as a teaching tool and will include details of this case study in the report. As the interview highlighted, questions remain, however, about the extent to which such online interaction is an adequate or satisfying replacement for traditional classroom based activities.

Members:

Maria Paola Castiglioni (Grenoble II, FR), Dimitar Grigorov (Sofia, BG), Claire Langhamer (Sussex, UK) (co-chair), Tapio Onnela (Turku, FI) (co-chair), Carla Salvaterra (Bologna, IT), David Sephton (Primrose Publishing, UK), Katy Turton (Queen's, Belfast, UK) (co-chair), Bertine Bouwman (Utrecht, NL)

==== 4. EU-Turkey Dialogue ====
(FUBAR?)

=== Project Partners ===
Sixty universities and organizations from 29 countries participate in CLIOH-WORLD, meeting on a regular basis and developing links with European and World History associations in other continents. The 60 partners are:

| University | City | Country |
|---|---|---|
| Karl-Franzens-Universitat | Graz | AT |
| Paris-Lodron-Universitat | Salzburg | AT |
| Ghent University | Ghent | BE |
| Nov Balgarski Universitet | Sofia | BG |
| Sofiyski Universitet "Sveti Kliment Ohridski" | Sofia | BG |
| Panepistimio Kyprou | Nicosia | CY |
| Univerzita Karlova v Praze | Prague | CZ |
| Otto-Friedrich-Universitat | Bamberg | DE |
| Ruhr-Universitat | Bochum | DE |
| Technische Universität Chemnitz | Chemnitz | DE |
| Universität Potsdam | Potsdam | DE |
| Roskilde University Center | Roskilde | DK |
| Tartu Ülikool | Tartu | EE |
| Universitat de Barcelona | Barcelona | ES |
| Universitat Pompeu Fabra | Barcelona | ES |
| Universidad de Deusto | Bilbao | ES |
| Universidad Autonoma de Madrid | Madrid | ES |
| Oulun Yliopisto | Oulu | FI |
| Turun Yliopisto | Turku | FI |
| Universite Pierre Mendes France | Grenoble II | FR |
| Universite de Toulouse II | Le Mirail | FR |
| Ethniko kai Kapodistriako Panepistimio Athinon | Athens | GR |
| Panepistimio Dytikis Makedonias | Kozani | GR |
| Aristotelio Panepistimio | Thessalonikis | GR |
| Miskolci Egyetem | Miskolci | HU |
| Colaiste na hOllscoile Corcaigh | Cork | IE |
| Ollscoil na hEireann | Gaillimh-Galway | IE |
| Haskoli Islands | Reykjavik | IS |
| Università di Bologna | Bologna | IT |
| Università degli Studi di Milano | Milan | IT |
| Università degli Studi di Padova | Padova | IT |
| Università di Pisa | Pisa | IT |
| Università degli Studi di Roma Tre | Rome | IT |
| Vilniaus Universitetas | Vilnius | LT |
| Latvijas Universitāte | Riga | LV |
| L-Universita ta’ Malta | Msida | MT |
| Rijksuniversiteit | Groningen | NL |
| Universiteit Utrecht | Utrecht | NL |
| Universitetet i Oslo | Oslo | NO |
| Uniwersytet w Białymstoku | Białystok | PL |
| Uniwersytet Jagielloński | Kraków | PL |
| Universidade de Coimbra | Coimbra | PT |
| Universidade Nova de Lisboa | Lisbon | PT |
| Universitatea Babeș Bolyai din Cluj-Napoca | Cluj | RO |
| Universitatea "Alexandru Ioan Cuza" | Iași | RO |
| Universitatea "Ștefan cel Mare" | Suceava | RO |
| Linköpings Universitet | Linköping | SE |
| Uppsala Universitet | Uppsala | SE |
| Univerza v Mariboru | Maribor | SI |
| Univerzita Mateja Bela | Banska Bystrica | SK |
| Cukurova Universitesi | Adana | TR |
| Karadeniz Teknik Universitesi | Trabzon | TR |
| University of Aberdeen | Aberdeen | UK |
| Queen's University, Belfast | Belfast | UK |
| University of Sussex | Brighton | UK |
| The University of the West of England | Bristol | UK |
| University of Edinburgh | Edinburgh | UK |
| University of Strathclyde | Strathclyde | UK |
| Swansea University | Swansea | UK |
| Primrose Publishing | | UK |

There are also 9 associate partners: Universitat Basel (CH) ISHA - International Students of History Association Universiteti i Tiranes (AL) Univerzitet u Banjoj Luci (BA) Univerzitet u Sarajevu (BA) Osaka University, Graduate School of Letters (JP) Univerzitet "Sv. Kliment Ohridski"- Bitola (MK) Moskowskij Gosudarstvennyj Oblastnoj Universitet (RU) Univerzitet u Novom Sadu (SCG) CLIOH-WORLD also maintains links with CLIOHRES, CoRe2, Tuning, HUMART and ISHA (the International Students of History Association).

== CLIOHRES ==
CLIOHRES ("Creating Links and Innovative Overviews for a New History Research Agenda for the Citizens of a Growing Europe") is a Sixth Framework Programme Network of Excellence organized by a group of 45 universities, some of which are CLIOH.net members.

A five-year project, it aims at achieving and disseminating greater understanding of both the actual histories and the representations of the past current in Europe today, highlighting both diversities and connections and explaining the development context. It brings together historians, geographers, art historians, linguists, theologists, philologists, sociologists and philosophers in order to explore how differences, connections, conflicts and positive interaction have developed in the past and can develop in the future. It involves 180 research staff and doctoral students from 31 countries.

CLIOHRES has six thematic working groups. They are:

1. States, legislation, institutions
2. Power and culture, including language, art and architecture
3. Religious and Philosophical concepts
4. Work, Gender and Society
5. Frontiers and Identities
6. Europe and the World

=== Work, Gender and Society Thematic Working Group ===
The exact priorities, pathways and specific work-plan of the Thematic Working Group (TWG) of Cliohres responsible for work, gender and society will be defined by the Group and will follow the general scheme outlined. However, on the basis of previous planning, the agenda is to examine the different ways in which society has organized itself in different times and places, with respect to the organization of labor, the definition of gender roles, civic and family structures.

The ways these forms of organization have been or have not been exported to other parts of the world, the extent to which they define a kind of European-ness, or vice versa, the extent to which national, regional and chronological differences are significant within Europe will be examined as will the links with colonial society and with political and economic changes in the role of Europe in the 19th and 20th centuries. The central methodological core around which this TWG will work sees the study of gender as a valuable tool for understanding social evolutions rather than as an end in itself.

== See also ==
- House of European History
