= Studentersamfunnet i Bergen =

Student organisation in Bergen, Norway

Coordinates: 60.3895°N 5.3227°E

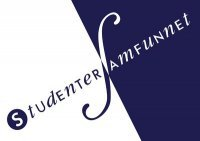
Studentersamfunnets logo

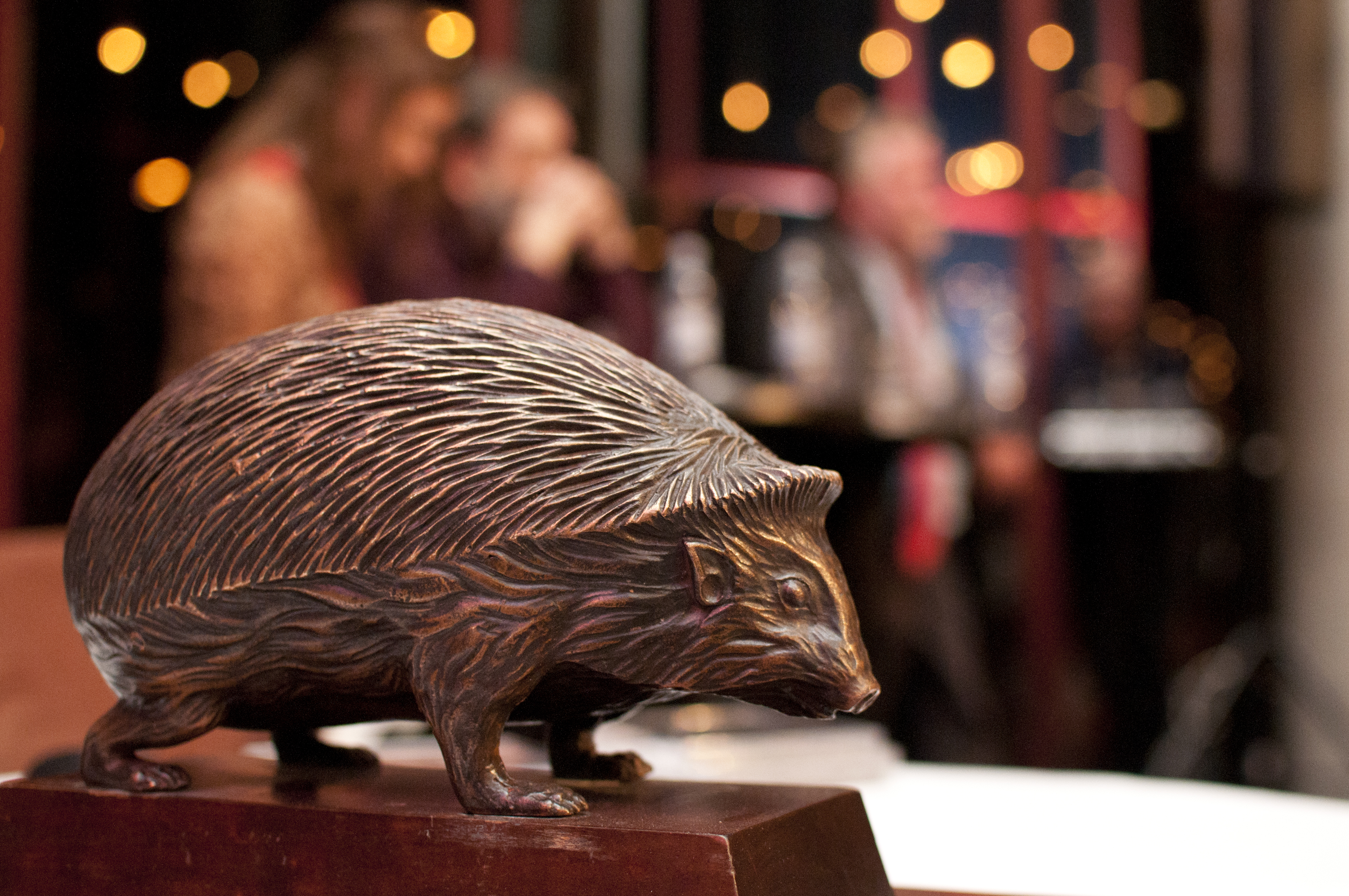
His Majesty the Hedgehog, Erinaceus europeus minor, Rex et Inspirator

Studentersamfunnet i Bergen, (eng. Bergen Student Society), is the oldest public student organisation in Bergen, Norway. It was founded in 1934, 12 years before the University of Bergen, by students and academics from Bergen Museum founded in 1825 and seat of higher education and research in Western Norway. The Student Society is the largest independent arena for political, academic and cultural debates in Western Norway. Most of the meetings are held at Det Akademiske Kvarter, the student house in Bergen.

The organisation arranges debates, lectures and meetings on many different political, cultural and scientific subjects. It has hosted prominent people such as Shirin Ebadi, Norman Finkelstein, Desmond Tutu and Fredrik Barth. The program is planned and booked by volunteer students from the various educational institutions in Bergen.

The protector of Studentersamfunnet is a european hedgehog, called Hans Majestet Pinnsvinet (Erinaceus europeus minor, Rex et Inspirator). Hans Majestet Pinnsvinet is also the head of an academic order of honour, named Pinnsvinordenen (Order of the Hedgehog) awarded to selected former members of the Student Society for their commitment and work for the organization.

== Literature ==
- Paal Nupen og Gaute Losnegård (1999) Ordet er fritt! Studentersamfunnet i Bergen 1934-1999. Eget Forlag, Bergen
- Rådet i Studentersamfunnet (2011) "Hvitebok for Studentersamfunnet i Bergen"
- Eirik Løkke (red.) (2009) "Studentersamfunnet 75 år"
- Styret i Studentersamfunnet (2009) "Jubileumsprogram: Studentersamfunnet 1934-2009"
