= International Conference of Physics Students =

Annual conference

The International Conference of Physics Students (ICPS) is an annual conference of the International Association of Physics Students (IAPS). Usually, up to 500 students from all over the world attend the event, which takes place in another country every year in August. The event includes the opportunity for students at bachelor, master and doctoral level to present their research, whilst listening and interacting with invited speakers of international reputation. During the event, usually lasting between 5 and 7 days, the IAPS holds its annual general meeting (AGM) and elects a new executive committee. The choice of the host country of ICPS is made two years in advance.

== Program ==
The main component of the conference consists of lectures given by the students themselves for other students. Guest lectures held by invited speakers and lab tours complete the scientific program. Further activities include city tours, excursions and social events. The participation fee is usually close to €200 per person, including accommodation, food and any extra activity organised by the local committee.

== Conference venues ==
The following list contains the venues of the ICPS conferences

- 2022 Puebla, Mexico
- 2021 Copenhagen, Denmark
- 2020 Puebla, Mexico (cancelled due to COVID-19 pandemic)
- 2019 Cologne, Germany
- 2018 Helsinki, Finland
- 2017 Turin, Italy
- 2016 Malta
- 2015 Zagreb, Croatia
- 2014 Heidelberg, Germany
- 2013 Edinburgh, United Kingdom
- 2012 Utrecht, The Netherlands
- 2011 Budapest, Hungary
- 2010 Graz, Austria
- 2009 Split, Croatia
- 2008 Kraków, Poland
- 2007 London, United Kingdom
- 2006 Bucharest, Romania
- 2005 Coimbra, Portugal
- 2004 Novi Sad, Serbia and Montenegro
- 2003 Odense, Denmark
- 2002 Budapest, Hungary
- 2001 Dublin, Ireland
- 2000 Zadar, Croatia
- 1999 Helsinki, Finland
- 1998 Coimbra, Portugal
- 1997 Vienna, Austria
- 1996 Szeged, Hungary
- 1995 Copenhagen, Denmark
- 1994 St. Petersburg, Russia
- 1993 Bodrum, Turkey
- 1992 Lisbon, Portugal
- 1991 Vienna, Austria
- 1990 Amsterdam, Netherlands
- 1989 Freiburg, Germany
- 1988 Prague, Czechoslovakia
- 1987 Debrecen, Hungary
- 1986 Budapest, Hungary

== History ==
In 1985 a group of Hungarian students decided to host a gathering of Physics students from all over the world. This resulted in the first International Conference of Physics Students in 1986. Due to the large success of this conference a second meeting in 1987 was organized in Debrecen, Hungary. At this occasion the International Association of Physics Students was founded. Furthermore, it was decided to have an International meeting annually.

Since then, 30 conferences have taken place.

=== ICPS 2017 ===
The ICPS 2017 took place in Turin, between August 7 and August 14, hosted by the Italian Association of Physics Students (Associazione Italiana Studenti di Fisica) (AISF). The Italian Organizing Committee prepared the formal bid to host the conference only one year after its foundation, when it was not yet formally recognized as a National Committee of IAPS. The event was mostly held at the Campus Einaudi, with an opening ceremony hosted at the Cavallerizza Reale and the Rector's Palace of the University of Turin. Approximately 450 students attended the event and almost 50 volunteers from AISF were involved in the conference activities. Notable guests were Elena Aprile (Columbia University), Steve Cowley (University of Oxford), Roberto Vittori (European Space Agency) and James Kakalios (University of Minnesota, author of the popular book The Physics of Superheroes). Young invited speakers included Francesco Tombesi (NASA), Agnese Bissi (Harvard University) and Francesco Prino (University of Turin). The program of ICPS 2017 comprised visits to the National Centre for Oncological Hadrontherapy in Pavia, traditional wine cellars, the Italian Institute of Technology in Genoa, the Venaria Reale palace, the Sacra di San Michele Abbey and a number of innovation hubs in Northern Italy.

=== ICPS 2016 ===
The ICPS 2016 took place from August, 11th to August, 17th in Malta and was hosted by physics students from the University of Malta. Around 350 physics students attended the conference. Notable guest speakers were Jocelyn Bell Burnell from the University of Oxford and Mark McCaughrean from ESA.

=== ICPS 2015 ===
The ICPS 2015 took place from August, 12th to August, 19th in Zagreb and was hosted by physics students from the Croatian Physical Society. Around 400 physics students attended the conference. Notable guest speakers was Prof. Philip W. Phillips.

=== ICPS 2014 ===
The ICPS 2014 took place from August, 10th to August, 17th in Heidelberg and was hosted by physics students from the jDPG. Around 450 physics students attended the conference. Notable guest speakers were Metin Tolan, Karlheinz Meier and John Dudley, president of the European Physical Society.

=== ICPS 2013 ===
The ICPS 2013 took place from August, 15th to August, 21st in Edinburgh and was hosted by physics students from Heriot-Watt University. Around 400 physics students attended the conference.

=== ICPS 2012 ===
The ICPS 2012 took place from August, 3rd to August, 10th in Utrecht and was hosted by physics students from SPIN. Around 400 physics students attended the conference.

=== ICPS 2011 ===
The ICPS 2011 took place from August, 11th to August, 18th in Budapest and was hosted by physics students from the Hungarian Association of Physics Students (Mafihe). Around 400 physics students attended the conference. Notable guest speakers were Ferenc Krausz from the Max Planck Institute for Quantum Optics, Carlo Rubbia from CERN, and Laszlo Kiss from the Kinkily Observatory.

=== ICPS 2010 ===
The ICPS 2010 took place from August, 17th to August, 23rd in Graz and was hosted by physics students from both Graz University of Technology and University of Graz. A total of 446 students attended the conference. This number includes 64 volunteers to help to organize the event. Notable guest speakers were Peter Zoller and Sabine Schindler, both University of Innsbruck; and John Ellis from CERN.

== See also ==
- University of Malta
- Graz University of Technology
- University of Heidelberg
