= Pro tempore (journal) =

- Discipline: History
- Language: Croatian
- Edited by: Matija Pudić

Publication details
- History: 2004-present
- Publisher: Department of History, Faculty of Humanities and Social Sciences, University of Zagreb (Croatia)
- Frequency: Annual

Standard abbreviations
- ISO 4: Pro tempore

Indexing
- ISSN: 1334-8302

Links
- Journal homepage

Pro tempore is a Croatian academic journal. It covers topics in Croatian and world history, and historiography, publishing a selection of articles, interviews, essays, in memoriams and book reviews. Since 2008 each issue has dealt with a specific topic in history, such as the early modern period, cultural history, gender history, business history and the Annales School. Also, since 2009 many international scholars have published their contributions.

The historical journal, founded in 2004 by students, was published by ISHA-Zagreb (the Zagreb section of the International Students of History Association) for the first 15 issues. Starting from 16th issue current publisher is Department of History, Faculty of Humanities and Social Sciences, University of Zagreb. The journal is published once or twice a year in Croatian, with some articles in English.

In 2010, the journal organized a round table (Annales in Perspective: Designs and Accomplishments) on the 80th anniversary of the founding of the Annales d'histoire économique et sociale with André Burguière as the keynote speaker. As of 2010 the editorial board is organizing movie nights dedicated to films made in collaboration with notable historians.
