= AMGE-Caravane =

French association for Moroccan students and alumni

AMGE-Caravane, also known as Association des Marocains aux Grandes Ecoles et aux Universités, is a French association founded in 1994, of over 5,000 members dedicated to Moroccan students and alumni.

== Objectives ==
AMGE-Caravane's main objective is to serve Moroccan students and young professionals before, during and after their studies in France, while:

- Helping students make thoughtful academic and professional through informational and orientation operations starting in Morocco and through their arrival in France.
- Giving fair and equal access to the Moroccan firms recruiting services, through the annual Forum Horizons Maroc job fair, as well as business meetings and interview sessions all year long.
- Gathering young Moroccans in France around issues making the headlines of the country, through conferences and seminars with national leaders and experts, as well as cultural and social events.

== Branches ==
AMGE-Caravane is based in Paris, and has branches in Lille, Lyon, Rouen and Toulouse.
