= Network of Concerned Historians =

International human rights organization

- Founded: 1995; 31 years ago
- Type: NGO
- Purpose: History, memory
- Headquarters: Groningen, Netherlands
- Region served: Worldwide
- Website: https://concernedhistorians.org/

The Network of Concerned Historians (NCH) is a human rights network providing a bridge between international human rights organizations campaigning for censored or persecuted historians (and other concerned with the past) and the global community of historians. Its work consists of two core activities: the collection of information on persecuted and censored historians; and the dissemination of urgent actions for persecuted and censored historians (and others who write about the past). The NCH publishes an Annual Report covering countries around the globe.

== Background ==
=== History ===
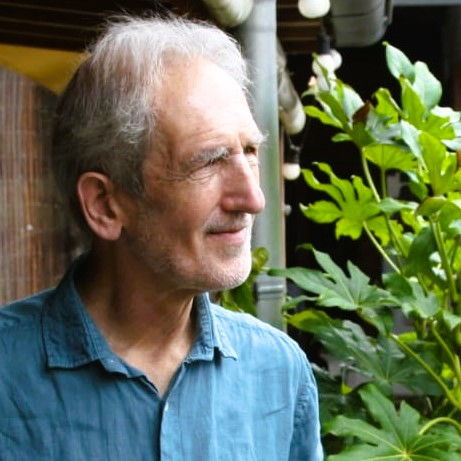
Antoon de Baets, founder of the NCH

NCH was created in 1995 by Antoon De Baets, prof. em. of History, Ethics and Human Rights by Special Appointment of the European Association of History Educators (EuroClio) at the University of Groningen (2014–) and President of the International Commission for the History and Theory of Historiography (2022–). It was partly inspired by a roundtable titled "Power, Liberty and the Work of the Historian" at the 1995 International Congress of Historical Sciences in Montreal. In the Summer of 2020, Ruben Zeeman, a graduate student of Comparative History at the Central European University, joined NCH as co-editor.

=== Affiliates ===
In 2001, NCH became one of the founding members of the Network for Education and Academic Rights (NEAR). It has fraternal ties with Academia Solidaria of the Historia a Debate at the University of Santiago de Compostela (since 2003) and with the Scholar Rescue Fund of the Institute of International Education in New York (since 2008). It is further affiliated with several international human rights organizations, including Scholars at Risk (since 2007), the Science and Human Rights Coalition of the American Association for the Advancement of Science (since 2008), the Montreal Institute for Genocide and Human Rights Studies (since 2011), the European Association of History Educators (since 2012), the International Students of History Association (since 2013), Contested Histories (since 2021) and PEN America (since 2024). Its website is regularly archived by the Center for Human Rights Documentation & Research at Columbia University.

== Structure ==
=== Mission ===
NCH is inspired by article 1 of the Constitution of the International Committee of Historical Sciences (1926, as amended in 1992 and 2005): “It [the Committee] shall defend freedom of thought and expression in the field of historical research and teaching, and is opposed to the misuse of history and shall use every means at its disposal to ensure the ethical professional conduct of its members.”

It works according to four principles:

1. Universality; it works for bona fide historians everywhere, regardless of where they live, in democratic or non-democratic countries...
2. Impartiality; ...and regardless of who they are, mainstream historians or their opponents.
3. Independence; it receives no subsidies.
4. Distance; its presented information does not imply that NCH shares the views of historians (or others) mentioned in it.

=== Topics ===
Its work revolves around five core topics:

1. History, including limitations to archival access, legal cases against historians, politicization of history education curricula and textbooks and censorship of historical research and popular history production (e.g. novels, films, theater, internet).
2. Memory, including limitations to commemorations and access to cemeteries and memorials, and the destruction of cultural heritage.
3. Freedom of information and expression, including laws infringing on the freedom of information and freedom of expression, defamation and libel cases and cases on privacy and secrecy.
4. Right to the truth, including the obstruction of the operations of transitional justice and truth commissions, the passing of impunity laws and the forestalling of reparations and reconciliation measures
5. Activism by historians and others concerned with the past, including political, journalistic and human rights advocacy.

Among the professions represented in NCH's work are historians, archivists, archaeologists, anthropologists, students, history teachers, librarians, truth commission members, journalists, authors and film makers.

== Activities ==
=== Annual Reports ===
NCH publishes an Annual Report documenting instances of censorship that fall within its mandate and happened globally in the preceding year. The Report is published every August and contains on average 150 pages covering 100+ countries. The Annual Reports have been published since 1995 and are all available on NCH's website. In its 2024 report, the regional distribution was: Europe/Central Asia (36); Middle East/North Africa (16); Americas (14); Sub-Saharan Africa (24); Asia/Pacific (21). Its documentation is based on information provided by trusted news and human rights organizations, including various United Nations sources; Amnesty International, Human Rights Watch, Index on Censorship, PEN International, Article 19; and BBC News, New York Times, The Guardian, Le Monde, and Al Jazeera.

=== Campaigns for Historians ===
In addition to regular documentation, it also disseminates campaigns on history-related topics with its community of around 3530 addressees (January 2025). Past campaigns included letter writing campaigns set up by Amnesty International and petitions shared by Memorial (society). In 2024, it shared campaigns for the Sierra Leonean historian and journalist Chernoh Alpha Bah, the imprisoned President of the Truth and Dignity Commission (Tunisia) Sihem Bensedrine, and the detained Talysh historian Igbal Abilov.

=== Further Resources ===
Whereas archiving documentation on the censorship of history worldwide and campaigning for history-related topics are its core operations, NCH also collects information on a variety of other history-related subjects:

1. Memorial: It compiles a memorial for historians killed for political reasons from Ancient times to the present.
2. Legal cases: It collects history-related cases, including those related to time, memory and the work of historians.
3. Defamation cases: It brings together defamation cases targeting or brought by historians.
4. Codes of Ethics; It gathers codes of ethics for historians, archaeologists and archivists.
5. Human Rights Resources: It provides a database of human rights resources for historians, including those documenting academic freedom, basic human rights, international condemnations, copyright, cultural rights, democracy, disappearances, responsibilities, education, right to be forgotten, freedom of expression, access to information, past and future generations, genocide, hate speech, heritage, holocaust, international humanitarian law, impunity, journalism, judicialization of history, memory laws, museums, national security, peace, time bars, privacy, reparation, reputation, tradition, right to the truth, victims, wills.
6. UN resolutions: It gives an overview of United Nations General Assembly Resolutions related to history (1946–Present).
7. Historians and the Nobel Peace Prize (1901–Present)
8. List of Historically Informed Political Leaders
9. Political Figures with a Historian's Background Indicted by International Tribunals
