= Hans Majestet Pinnsvinet =

Coordinates: 60.3895°N 5.3227°E

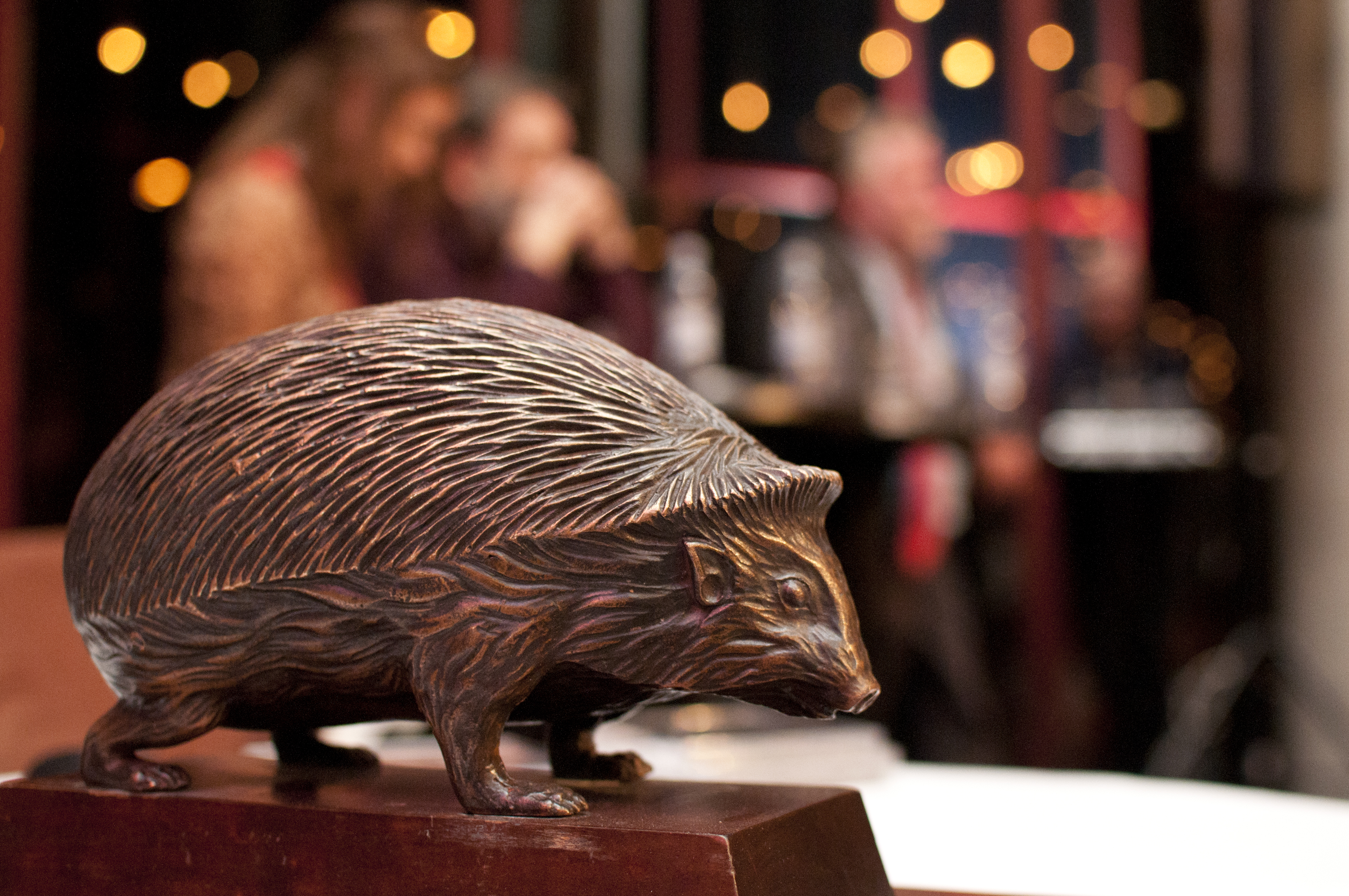
His Majesty the Hedgehog, Erinaceus europeus minor, Rex et Inspirator

Hans Majestet Pinnsvinet (eng. His Majesty the Hedgehog), or Erinaceus europaeus minor, Rex et Inspirator, is the high protector of Studentersamfunnet i Bergen (eng. Bergen Student Society). The Majesty appeared in 1935, one year after the Student Society was founded. To appoint an animal as protector is a tradition in Norwegian student organisations, dating back too 1859 when Norwegian Students' Society in Oslo selected a pig as their highest protector.

The hedgehog is also head of Pinnsvinordenen (lat. "Ordo Erinacei"), an order of honour awarded to selected former members of the Student Society for their commitment and work for the organization. The order started as a parody of the royal orders and academic ceremony. The only human to receive the highest decoration of Pinnsvinordenen is Olav V of Norway, who was the Crown Prince of Norway at the time of the ceremony.
