= Kvarteret =

Student organization in Bergen, Norway

Coordinates: 60°23′23.07″N 5°19′19.27″E

Det Akademiske Kvarter

Det Akademiske Kvarter, more commonly known as Kvarteret, is a student cultural center in Bergen, Norway. It is situated on Olav Kyrres gate in the center of Bergen, within walking distance of both the main shopping areas and the University of Bergen.

== History ==
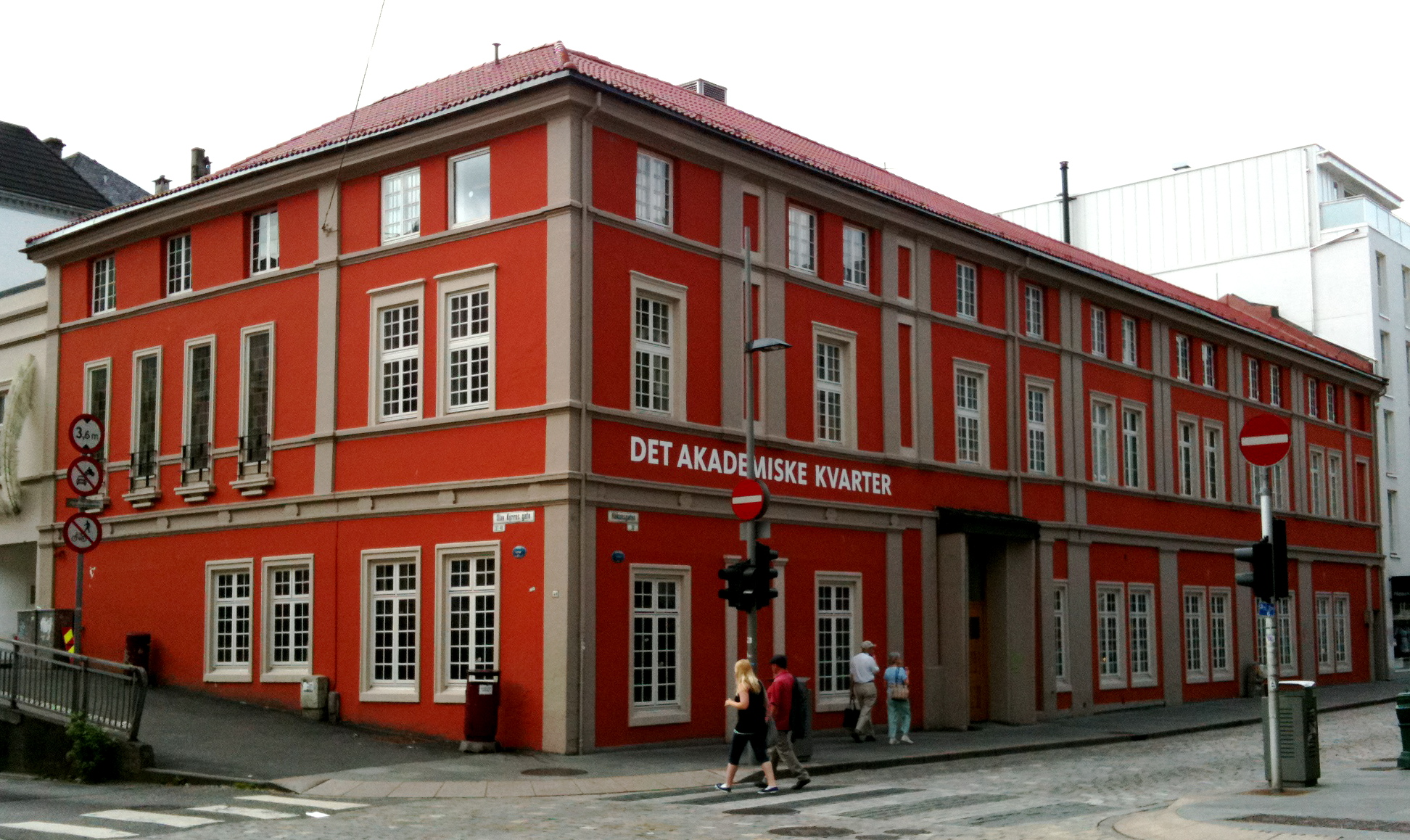
Det Akademiske Kvarter

Kvarteret hosts a huge number of events each year, ranging from debates and lectures to concerts. The house is run by about 400 volunteer students. In addition to hosting cultural events, it offers the volunteers experience as sound technicians, bartenders, photographers and system administrators. The students who work here primarily come from the University of Bergen as well as from the Norwegian School of Economics (Norges Handelshøyskole) and Bergen University College (Høgskolen i Bergen).

Kvarteret has an old exterior, but the interior is roughly 10 years old. The house was formerly the property of the University, but was given over to the students to be the cultural centre of student activities in 1995. At that time, the house's interior was completely rehabilitated. Kvarteret was reopened February 5, 2010 after three years of reconstruction. There are now several pubs, a cinema, nightclub, small café, auditorium and concert hall.

== Affiliates ==
Though Kvarteret hosts a variety of cultural events, none of them are actually organized by Kvarteret itself. Numerous organizations use the building for their cultural activities. These include the Bergen student community (Studentersamfunnet i Bergen), Immaturus student theater club (Studentteateret Immaturus), Active student association (Aktive Studenters Forening), Bergen Realist Association (Bergen Realistforening) and the Bergen film club (Bergen Filmklubben).
