= International Association of Physics Students =

- Abbreviation: IAPS
- Formation: 1987
- Headquarters: Mulhouse
- Location: France
- Official language: English
- President: Cyrus Walther
- Affiliations: European Physical Society; International Union of Pure and Applied Physics; International Science Council
- Website: http://iaps.info

The International Association of Physics Students (IAPS) is a non-profit umbrella organization for physics students associations. Its official seat is in Mulhouse, France in the headquarters of the European Physical Society. It was founded in 1987 in Debrecen, Hungary.

== Introduction ==
IAPS is an association of physics students and student societies from around the globe, working to promote peaceful collaboration amongst its members. These are represented by national and local committees, who meet regularly to ensure the relevance of activities. Since 1987, IAPS has worked continuously to support friendly relations and collaboration between physics students. The group supports its members in their academic and professional work by discussing and acting on scientific, social and cultural issues. IAPS is a recognised non-governmental organisation run entirely by students from around the world.

IAPS runs an annual International Conference of Physics Students (ICPS), one of the biggest student organized conferences in the world. IAPS also organizes visits to global research institutions such as CERN or Culham Centre for Fusion Energy, international physics competitions, summer schools, exchange programmes and multinational meetings.

On a daily basis, IAPS is run by an Executive Committee, which is elected at the Annual General Meeting (AGM), held during the ICPS with the participation of all member societies. Most of the activities are run through the help of student volunteers, whose collaboration is necessary to ensure that all activities are offered at prices that allow participation from countries with weaker economies.

Throughout its existence, IAPS has been accumulating a number of partnerships with several international organizations. Between the most long-standing collaborators stand the European Physical Society (EPS) and the International Union of Pure and Applied Physics (IUPAP)—in which IAPS constitutes the Affiliated Commission of Physics Students (AC5). IAPS continuously pursues collaborative partnership efforts with other organizations to have a positive impact in the global scientific community.

== Structure ==
IAPS is run by an Executive Committee, which is elected at the Annual General Meeting (AGM). IAPS members may be national physics student organisations, called National Committees (NC), physics student association localised at one university or city, called Local Committees (LC) and individual members (IM) if none of the before are present where one studies. In a broad sense, all the members of NCs and LCs, as well as IMs, are members of IAPS. Membership costs are calculated for each applicant based on the type of committee and the GDP of applicant countries.

=== Executive committee ===
The IAPS Executive Committee (EC) is currently composed of 9 students, elected by representatives of the member societies. The 2022/23 EC is composed of:

Title	Name	Nationality	Affiliation
President	Cyrus Walther	Germany	Technical University of Dortmund
Vice President & Events Manager	Niloofar Jokar	Iran	Isfahan University of Technology
Treasurer	Mario Gaimann	Germany	University of Stuttgart
Secretary & Data Protection Officer	Thibault Fredon	France	Massachusetts Institute of Technology
Membership and Advocacy Manager	Marisol Castellanos	Guatemala	Universidad de San Carlos de Guatemala
Outreach Manager	Anna Christoforidou	Greece	National and Kapodistrian University of Athens
PR Manager	Dimitris Gkavakos	Greece	National and Kapodistrian University of Athens
IT Manager	Roberto Ciccareli	Italy	University of Turin
Recruitment Manager	Gabriel Maynard	Costa Rica	Universidad de San Carlos de Guatemala

=== National Committees ===
Member Nation	Organisation
Austria	Basisgruppe Physik der TU Graz
Bosnia and Herzegovina	Asocijacija studenta fizike BiH
Croatia	Studentska sekcija Hrvatskog fizikalnog društva
Czech Republic	Czech Association of Physics Students
Cuba	Sección Joven Sociedad Cubana de Física
Denmark	Fysikstuderende i Danmark (FSID)
Finland	Suomen Fysiikanopiskelijat ry
France	Le Réseau Jeunes SPF, Société Française de Physique
Georgia	საქართველოს ფიზიკის სტუდენტთა ასოციაცია (GAPS)
Germany	Deutsche Physikalische Gesellschaft
Greece	Hellenic Association of Physics Students
Honduras	Asociación Hondureña de Estudiantes de Física
Hungary	Magyar Fizikushallgatók Egyesülete (Mafihe)
India	Indian Network of Physics Students (INPS)
Italy	Associazione Italiana Studenti di Fisica (AISF)
North Macedonia	Македонско друштво на студенти физичари
Mexico	Sociedad Científica Juvenil
Morocco	الجمعية المغربية للفيزياء (MAP)
Montenegro	Crnogorska asocijacija studenata fizike
Netherlands	Studenten Physica in Nederland (SPIN)
Norway	Norske Fysikkstudenters Forening Trodheim
Poland	Polskie Stowarzyszenie Studentów Fizyki (PSSF)
Portugal	Physis – Associação Portuguesa de Estudantes de Física
Serbia	Asocijacija studenata fizike Srbije
Spain	Grupo de Estudiantes de la Real Sociedad Española de Física (GdeE-RSEF)
Switzerland	Young Physicists Forum (YPF)
Tunisia	Physicist Community FST
United Kingdom and Ireland	University Student Network (USN), Institute of Physics
United States	Society of Physics Students (SPS), American Institute of Physics

=== Local Committees ===
Member Nation	Organisation
Ankara, Turkey	ODTÜ Fizik Topluluğu (OFT)
Antwerp, Belgium	Wiskunde, Informatica en Natuurkunde kring (WINAK)
Baguio, Philippines	UP Physics Sphere
Ben Srour, Algeria	رائد في مجال تعليم (AAMP)
Bucharest, Romania	Asociația Studenților Fizicieni a Universității București (ASF-UB)
San Pedro Montes de Oca, Costa Rica	Asociación de Estudiantes de Física y Meteorología (AEFISYMET)
Farhangian University, Iran	Farhangian Association of Physics Students
Guatemala City, Guatemala	Asociación de Estudiantes de Física y Matemática (AEFM)
Isfahan, Iran	(IUT) دانشگاه صنعتی اصفهان
Kathmandu, Nepal	St. Xavier's Physics Council
Kharkiv, Ukraine	Рада молодих вчених і спеціалістів, ФТІНТ ім. Б.І. Вєркіна НАН України
Limbe, Cameroon	African Institute for Mathematical Sciences Cameroon (AIMS Cameroon)
Msida, Malta	S Cubed – the Science Students' Society
Manila City, Philippines	The Polytechnic University of the Philippines Physics Society (PUP Physics Society)
Nanyang Technological University, Singapore	Odyssey Club
Quito, Ecuador	The Optical Society – Universidad San Francisco de Quito Capítulo Estudiantil (OSA-USFQ Capítulo Estudiantil)
Saint Petersburg, Russia	Сообщество студентов-физиков Политехнического университета (PCPS)
Santo Domingo, Dominican Republic	Asociación de Estudiantes de Física de la Universidad Autónoma de Santo Domingo (AEF-UASD)

=== Individual Members ===
Students of physics or related subjects who do not have access to an NC or LC may join as IMs. Only IAPS members may attend IAPS events such as ICPS. Currently IAPS has around 150 individual members.

=== Honorary Members ===
The following people were elected Honorary Fellows by an IAPS AGM:

- Sir Arnold Wolfendale
- Sir Joseph Rotblat (Nobel Laureate), died in 2005
- Patroklosz Budai (2005)
- Tamás Fülöp (2005)
- Ákos Horváth (2005)
- Péter Lévai (2005)
- Péter Ván (2005)
- Jim Grozier (2008)
- David Lee (2024)
- Michel Spiro (2024)
- Jens Vigen (2024)

== Programs ==
Group picture at the International Conference of Physics Students 2014, held in Heidelberg, Germany.

=== International Conference of Physics Students ===
ICPS International Conference of Physics Students is the International Conference of Physics Students, which is the main event of IAPS, organized yearly by one of its member committees. The purpose of the conference is to create an opportunity for physics students from all around the world to come together, to talk about science and life, to practice presenting their research and, all in all, to have a great time.

The first ICPS was organized by students of the Eötvös Loránd University, in Budapest, Hungary in the year 1986. The event had less than fifty participants, but since then, the conference has grown considerably, nowadays bringing together more than four hundred students.

The one-week conference includes scientific, social, and touristic programs. Participants attend and deliver lectures on physics topics, visit laboratories in the host city, and interact with physics students from different countries. The program also includes exposure to different cultures and the host region.

The following were venues of the ICPS conferences:

Year	Location
2022	Puebla, Mexico (online)
2021	Copenhagen, Denmark (online)
2020	Not held due to COVID-19 pandemic
2019	Cologne, Germany
2018	Helsinki, Finland
2017	Turin, Italy
2016	Malta
2015	Zagreb, Croatia
2014	Heidelberg, Germany
2013	Edinburgh, United Kingdom
2012	Utrecht, Netherlands
2011	Budapest, Hungary
2010	Graz, Austria
2009	Split, Croatia
2008	Kraków, Poland
2007	London, United Kingdom
2006	Bucharest, Romania
2005	Coimbra, Portugal
2004	Novi Sad, Serbia and Montenegro
2003	Odense, Denmark
2002	Budapest, Hungary
2001	Dublin, Ireland
2000	Zadar, Croatia
1999	Helsinki, Finland
1998	Coimbra, Portugal
1997	Vienna, Austria
1996	Szeged, Hungary
1995	Copenhagen, Denmark
1994	Saint Petersburg, Russia
1993	Bodrum, Turkey
1992	Lisbon, Portugal
1991	Vienna, Austria
1990	Amsterdam, Netherlands
1989	Freiburg, West Germany
1988	Prague, Czechoslovakia
1987	Debrecen, Hungary
1986	Budapest, Hungary

In addition, IAPS organizers a number of other events. In 2018, IAPS associated with the International Students of History Association (ISHA) in a Series of Conferences named HyPe (HistorY and Physics Experience), that took place in Bologna, Italy.

=== Excursions ===
Since its foundation, IAPS has organised several trips to international research facilities, either directly or through its member societies.

==== iaps2CERN ====
IAPS yearly organises annual tours to CERN, in Geneva (Switzerland). The highly successful iaps2CERN programme usually has approximately 40 participants, representing up to 20 different nationalities. The tour usually comprises visits of the CERN exhibitions, some of the experiments currently accessible and also a visit of the United Nations offices in Geneva.

== International Physics Competitions ==
PLANCKS is an annual international physics contest for bachelor and master students. It is usually a three day event and can include in addition to the competition itself scientific program like a symposium and excursions, as well as social events and the award ceremony. PLANCKS is arranged by different IAPS member committees.

In May 2014, the A-Eskwadraat student association held the first PLANCKS edition in Utrecht. Since then, it took place every year at varying places:

Year	Location	Winning country
2026	Eindhoven, Netherlands	Italy
2025	Barcelona, Spain	United Kingdom and Ireland
2024	Dublin, Ireland	Germany
2023	Milan, Italy	Italy
2022	Munich, Germany	United Kingdom and Ireland
2021	Porto, Portugal (online)	United Kingdom and Ireland
2020	London, United Kingdom (online)	United Kingdom and Ireland
2019	Odense, Denmark	Germany
2018	Zagreb, Croatia	Netherlands
2017	Graz, Austria	Spain
2016	Bucharest, Romania	Czech Republic
2015	Leiden, Netherlands	Netherlands
2014	Utrecht, Netherlands	Netherlands

IAPS also support other physics competitions, such as the Ortvay competition (organised by the Hungarian NC) and the International Physics Tournament.
