= ANLO =

The Academicus Neo Lovaniensis Ordo (in short, ANLO), is a mixed student corporation which is composed of present and alumni students of the University of Louvain (UCLouvain). It was founded on 26 September 1991.

== Nomenclature ==
- Ordo means the corporation, and its members, adhere to the rules written in the codex. The codex is mainly private, with the first title being public. This first title presents the objectives of the corporation as well as some details on the origin of the corporation.
- Academicus means the corporation only accepts members who are students or former university students, attached to the city of Louvain-la-Neuve (and its Alma Mater).

== History ==
The ANLO was founded on 26 September 1991. However, it was only inaugurated later on 26 April 1992 at 6H26 local time at the borders of the lake of Louvain-la-Neuve. The time between the foundation and the inauguration was used by the founding fathers to develop their ideas and write the codex mentioned above. The founding fathers are the following 8 people : François Boeck, Gabriel Dupret, Christophe Geus, Thomas Gilbert, Benoît Poncin, Eric Poepaert, Oliviers Servais and Li-An (Alexis) Tsien.

The inauguration that day followed several distinct steps :

- ceremony at the borders of the lake
- visit of the city of Leuven including the museum of folklore, the local brewery, statue of the Alma Mater at the St. Peter's Church
- taking of a sett from Leuven back to Louvain-la-Neuve which still today is an important symbol of the corporation
- first official reunion (or Chapter) of the Academicus Neo Lovaniensis Ordo

== Objectives ==
Most of the objectives are described in the first title of the codex.:

- Diffusion, promotion and practice of the student folkloric traditions, particularly at the University Catholique de Louvain.
- The defense and promotion of students of UCLouvain and the city of Louvain-la-Neuve
- Promotion of intellectual exchanges between members, based on the idea that students come from different backgrounds (both geographically and intellectually). This is in direct opposition with other well known corporations as the ASBO in Louvain la Neuve.
- Promotion of the writing of quality texts, which include folkloric ones (called guindailles in French).
- Development of respect and friendship between its members, inspiring by the (Latin) motto of the Corporation : "Sapientia et Amicitia".

== Members ==
=== Becoming a member ===
Someone aspiring to become a member of the corporation must be a student of UCLouvain. This criterion was put forward, not out of elitism, but to preserve some uniformity between the members. The aspiring members (called novici, which is a wrong Latinization of novices), before becoming one of the members (called eques) needs to prove himself on different points during the whole of an academic year. During this year, he will have to attend several courses on varying topics, such as the history of Louvain-la-Neuve, the life of students during Medieval Times, the other Belgian corporations, the knowledge of heraldic, the codex, etc. While attending these courses and the regular reunions, the novici will have the chance to get to know the folklore, the objectives and the other members better. Finally, to develop the aspect of multi-culturality and folklore promotion, each novici needs to prepare a conference on a free topic to the other members.

=== Permanent committee ===
As one of the eques, it is possible to become a member of the permanent committee in charge of the day to day organisation of the corporation. Several roles are similar to the ones from other corporations, often inspired by the older corporation ASMO. This committee is composed of 8 different people:

- Magister Magnus. This person is in charge of the safekeeping of the traditions and the good functioning of the corporation. Urgent decisions are taken by him, when no time to have a reunion to vote for it. This decision can be revoked by the committee. External relations with other corporations are also part of his duty.
- Substitutus. This person takes the place of the Magister Magnus if the latter is absent, as well as the place of any other absent member of the committee.
- Caensor. His role is to make sure at all time that members of the corporation follow the rules written in the codex. He has the authority to punish people if needed. Attributes needed for Chapters are in his possession outside activities.
- Cancellarius. He keeps the archives of the corporation in a safe place. During each activity, he takes note of what is happening, of what people are saying, etc. to make a report which will be published in the journal of the corporation (called Almanach). Finally, he must send out the invitations to every member and every other person who may be concerned.
- Quaestor. Every aspect that has to do with the finances of the corporation goes through him. Honorific medals are bought by and sold by him to the concerned members.
- Cellarius. On very practical grounds, he must find a place for every activity to take place.
- Paedagogus. He organizes the activities which conform to the objectives of the corporation. This may include cultural visits, conferences, etc.
- Tironum Maior. He's the person directly in contact with the Novici to teach and learn them about the rules, traditions and practices of the corporation.

These commitments are fixed to one academic year and can be renewed through the process of democratic elections. If the magister magnus is not reelected, he automatically becomes a member of the Senat. Others who are not reelected stay regular members for life.

=== Senate ===
The senate is composed of former magistri magni and the founding fathers. Their main role is to check that the committee is respecting the traditions, the spirit and the objectives of the corporation. They have an advisory role, which can be turned into a moralizing one if things don't go the way they should according to the codex.

== Clothing ==
All members (and the eques, after having passed a certain ritual during their first year) wear a distinct cape during the activities of the corporation. The overall color is purple, which is the color of the calotte typical for Belgian Catholic students. The borders of the cape are finished with blue and white lints. They also wear a blue and white band, finished with silver borders. The band's colors remember the colors of the Alma Mater. It goes over the left shoulder for novici and over the right one for eques.
