= International Association of Students in Agricultural and Related Sciences =

International Association of Students in Agricultural and Related Sciences (IAAS)
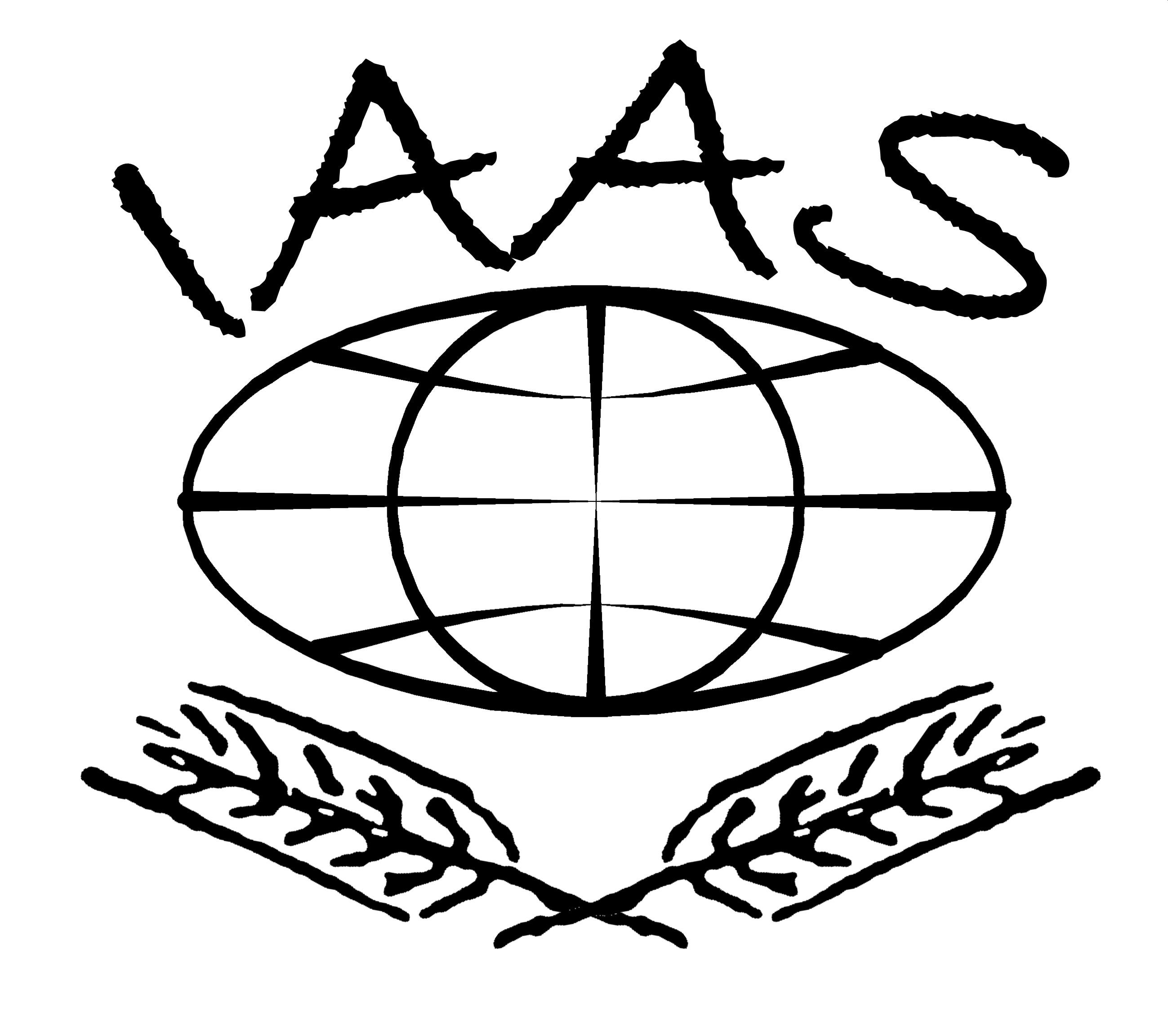
- IAAS Logo
- Abbreviation: IAAS
- Established: 1957 in Tunisia
- Type: Network for students in agricultural and related sciences
- Headquarters: Leuven, Belgium
- Location: International
- Official languages: English, Spanish, French
- Executive Board: President : S M Riaz-us Saleheen Vice President of External Relations: Simana Panta Vice President of Communication: S M Riaz-us Saleheen (In Charge) Vice President of Exchange: Chimi Hajar Vice President of Finance: Kevin Valencia
- Control Board: Head of Control Board: Jannatul Ferdwasi Membership Officer: Salma Naji Finance Officer: Chaimae Zergoun
- Website: http://www.iaasworld.org/

The International Association of students in Agricultural and related Sciences (IAAS) is an international non-profit and non-governmental student society headquartered in Leuven, Belgium. It was founded in 1957 in Tunisia by 8 countries. At the moment it is one of the world's biggest student organizations and one of the leading agricultural student associations. IAAS gathers students studying, majoring or researching in agriculture and related areas like environmental sciences, forestry, food science, landscape architecture etc. Its committees are spread in universities in over 55 countries worldwide.

== Activities ==
The principal aim of IAAS is to promote the exchange of knowledge, information, and ideas among students, and to improve the mutual understanding between countries and cultures. To do this it organizes activities like seminars, working camps, international meetings, exchange weeks, an international exchange program, small-scale development projects.

Every year in July, a member country organizes the Annual Congress, which consists of sessions of the General Assembly and a seminar. During the General Assembly, all decisions affecting the association are discussed during working groups and subsequently voted upon. Furthermore, the participants take the chance of having such an international group to discuss in forums about (agricultural) hot topics together with their fellow students from all over the world. The seminar usually deals with a specific (agricultural) topic and includes excursions, visits, lectures, social activities, and a tour of an area in the organizing country.

== Leadership ==
The main element of IAAS is the National Committees (NC) and Local Committees (LC), groups, and associations of students in universities all over the world working for the association. They organize and run activities like Seminars, Working Camps, Village Concept Projects.

The General Assembly (GA) is the supreme governing authority of the association. It gathers once a year during the Annual Congress and consists of delegates from all the member countries, which are appointed by the National Committees (a). Decisions are taken by voting, with each member country having one vote.

=== Major positions ===
- President

The task of the President is to represent the Association to its external partners and to ensure that the whole EB functions properly.

- Vice President of Finance

The VP of Finances takes care of the finances, grant application and bookkeeping.

- Vice President of Communication

The VP of Communication keeps in contact with the members and takes care of communication matters within the association.

- Vice President of External Relations

VP of Finances and VP of External Relations work closely together.

- Vice President of Exchange

The VP of Exchange is responsible for the coordination of the IAAS Exchange Program. Since 2006 the Exchange Quality Board helps with the task of improving this important activity.

== Membership ==
There are currently members of IAAS in the following countries per regions:

Africa: 1-Benin 2-Cameroon 3-DRC 4-Gambia 5-Ghana 6-Malawi 7-Mali 8-Niger 9-Nigeria 10-Senegal 11-Togo 12-Uganda

America: 13-Argentina 14-Brazil 15-Chile 16-Colombia 17-Costa Rica 18-Ecuador 19-Guatemala 20-Mexico 21-Panama 22-Paraguay 23-Peru 24-USA

Asia Pacific: 25-Afghanistan 26-Bangladesh 27-India 28-Indonesia 29-Japan 30-Nepal 31-South Korea 32-Sri Lanka 33-Taiwan 34-Austria 35-Azerbaijan 36-Belgium 37-Croatia 38-France 39-Germany 40-Greece 41-Hungary 42-Italy 43-Montenegro 44-Netherlands 45-Portugal 46-Serbia 47-Slovenia 48-Spain 49-Sweden 50-Switzerland 51-Turkey 52-UK

Middle East and North Africa: 53-Iran 54-Iraq 55-Morocco 56-Tunisia

== Partner organizations ==
=== Professional partners ===
- Association for European Life Science Universities (ICA), Partner
- Food and Agriculture Organization (FAO), Liaison Status
- UNESCO, Consultative Status
- United Nations Environment Programme (UNEP), Operational Status

=== Student organization partners ===
In the frame of the Informal Forum of International Student Organisations (IFISO), IAAS cooperates with other student organizations in the field of project development, fundraising, and strategic planning.

== History ==
IAAS was established in a decade in which nations all over the world were still recovering from the harsh devastation and suffering resulting from the Second World War. However, young people strongly fostered hope for progress, peace and stability. Students in the field of agriculture decided to come together and create a new international student platform by establishing IAAS more than half a century ago 1957 in Tunis, the same year when the Treaty of Rome has been signed to establish the European Community.

In this decade, students from all disciplines started to acknowledge their role as agents of change in society and decided to come together to share values. They realized that only by sharing diversity, they could really cooperate to build a better world, a world in peace, harmony, and freedom. Thus AIESEC, IAESTE, IFMSA, IVSA and IAAS have been established in less than one decade.

=== The early beginning ===
- 1954 The International Union of Students and the Romania Union sent invitations to students in agriculture all over the world for a meeting in Bucharest. It is the first attempt known of international cooperation between students in agriculture.
- 1956 In Paris an international week of study on agriculture took place. Students decided that UGET, the Tunis student union, would organize an international seminar on agriculture in summer 1957. The same year an international seminar for agricultural students was held in Norway.

=== Year of establishment ===
1957 was the real beginning of the IAAS, which was then called AIEA (Association Internationale des Etudiants en Agriculture) and had French as the working language.

Independent from the decisions made during the international meeting in Paris, the Students council from the Netherlands (NSR) also planned to organize an international seminar on agriculture from 22 till 29 June 1957. Around December 1956, NSR (Netherlands) and UGET (Tunis) got to know about each other's plans and this caused a conflict. UGET did not like the idea of having two international seminars so close to each other. However, several careful and diplomatic dialogues per mail, and a meeting in Leiden (the Netherlands) on 15–16 March 1957, resulted in cooperation and a tight friendship between Tahar Belkhodja (president of UGET) and R. van den Berg (president of NSR). The NSR decided to cancel its congress in Wageningen in favor of the one in Tunis and to cooperate intensively with UGET. It seems to be just an anecdote, but there are reasons to believe that this cooperation between The Netherlands and Tunisia was crucial for the continuity of IAAS in the first years. When the Dutch canceled their seminar, they asked all participants to come to the seminar in Tunis instead. This seminar turned out to be the founding World Congress of IAAS and Germany, Finland, The Netherlands, Norway, Romania, Switzerland, Czechoslovakia and of course Tunisia were the participating countries. A few other countries attended the congress as observers. Mr. Tahar Belkhodge (Tunisia) was elected as President and Mr. Fehr (France) was elected as Secretary General.

Also, the Dutch students were well prepared to organize a seminar in the Netherlands in 1958, which became the second world congress of IAAS.

=== Chronology of the annual World Congresses ===
- 1957 First International Congress in Tunis (Tunisia), foundation of IAAS (then AIEA) by Germany, Finland, The Netherlands, Norway, Romania, Switzerland, Czechoslovakia and Tunisia
- 1958 2nd Congress in Wageningen (The Netherlands), First to mention the exchange program.

New members: Belgium, Denmark, France and Sweden

Special event: The exchange did exist in two parts: The exchange weeks and training that were organized by IAESTE.

- 1959 3rd Congress in Vollebek (Norway)
- 1960 4th Congress in Rehovot (Israel); Topic: Intensive Agriculture

New member country: Israel

- 1961 5th Congress in Bern (Switzerland)

New member countries: Austria, Great Britain, Nigeria, Portugal

- 1962 6th Congress in Uppsala (Sweden); Topic: Agriculture and Cooperation

New member country: Yugoslavia

Special event: Executive committee of the association formed by the president, vice president and secretary general, working in headquarters in Leuven (Belgium), also Control Committee formed by four members and national representatives elected

- 1963 7th Congress in Brussels (Belgium); Topic: Belgian Agriculture

New member countries: Italy and Spain

Special event: the first issue of the JOINT, an IAAS Magazine edited by the Secretary General and a board; few issues every year

- 1964 8th Congress in Italy; didn't take place due to difficulties in the Italian Student Union
- 1965 9th Congress in Leeds (England)
- 1966 10th Congress in Vienna (Austria); Topic: Austrian Agriculture
- 1967 11th Congress in Rehovot (Israel); Topic: Agriculture in Israel
- 1968 12th Congress in Helsinki (Finland); Topic: Farming and Forestry in cooperation in Finland

New member country: Ireland

- 1969 13th Congress in Zurich (Switzerland); Topic: Special Problems in Swiss Agriculture

Special Event: first time a Responsible Meeting held at half term in Wageningen

- 1970 14th Congress in Denmark; Topic: Pollution Problems
- 1971 15th Congress in Stuttgart and Kiel (Germany); Topic: Higher Education in Agriculture
- 1972 16th Congress Oxford (Great Britain); Topic: The changing role of Agriculture in the developed countries

New members: Hungary and Poland

- 1973 17th Congress in Ghent (Belgium); Theme: Social aspects of Agriculture

New country: India

- 1974 18th Congress in Uppsala (Sweden); Topic: Underemployment - The Challenge for Rural development
- 1975 19th Congress in Langnau (Switzerland); Topic: Langnau in the Emmental Switzerland
- 1976 20th Congress in Rehovot (Israel); Topic: Agriculture in the Desert

Special event: Development fund created to assist member with fewer opportunities to attend our meetings, originally with support of the FAO

- 1977 21st Congress in Norway; Topic: Agriculture and Pollution

New member: Uganda

- 1978 22nd Congress in Helsinki (Finland); Topic: The Changing role of Rural Population

New member: Sudan

- 1979 23rd Congress in Nairobi (Kenya); Topic: The Role of Agricultural Institutes in adapting education for Rural Development

New members: Kenya and Togo

- 1980 24th Congress in Galicia (Spain); Topic: The Agrarian Extension and Training in Rural Development

New member countries: Liberia

- 1981 25th Congress in Warsaw (Poland); Theme: Agriculture and Food Production Today and Tomorrow

New member country: Zambia

- 1982 26th Congress in Copenhagen (Denmark); Topic: Farming as a way of living
- 1983 27th Congress in The Netherlands, Belgium and Luxembourg; Topic: Intensifying Agriculture meets National and International Responsibilities
- 1984 28th Congress in Wageningen (The Netherlands); Topic: Wageningen, an International Centre of Agricultural Research and Education

New members: Ghana and Tanzania

- 1985 29th Congress in Austria and Switzerland; Topic: The agriculture in two Alpine countries and their International Relations

New member country: Egypt

- 1986 Congress in Egypt; was cancelled by Egypt
- 1987 30th Congress in Lille (France); Topic: French Agriculture

Special event: First time to mention the formation of permanent working groups

- 1988 31st Congress in Perugia (Italy); Topic: Mediterranean Agriculture: Marginal Areas, Typical Production and its Transformation

New member: Benin

- 1989 32nd Congress in Nairobi (Kenya); Topic: Agriculture, Underproduction and its Future Prospects in Developing Countries

New Member: Thailand

- 1990 33rd Congress in Gödöllő, Hungary; Topic: Cooperatives have the Future

Special event: WOCAs created as Working Camps aiming at linking the theoretical aspect of our academic education with more practical experience

- 1991* 34th Congress in Thailand; Topic: South-Asian Agricultural System: its problems and future prospects

New member: Indonesia (Candidate Member). Special event: first WOCAs took place in Hungary and Portugal

- 1992 35th Congress in Belgium. Seminar in Belgium and The Netherlands.

New member: Indonesia (Full member)

- 1993 36th Congress in Brazil
- 1994 37th Congress in Slovenia and Switzerland; Topic: Challenges of Marginal Areas

New members: Guatemala, Armenia, Latvia, Croatia, Sri Lanka

- 1995 38th Congress in Denmark; Topic: Cooperatives in Agriculture-The Danish Way

New Members: Angola and Sierra Leone (Candidate Members)

- 1996 39th Congress in Indonesia; Topic: Tropical Agriculture in the Global Market
- 1997 40th Congress in Croatia; Topic: Food Security

New Members: Uruguay, Benin, United States, Ukraine, Belarus (Candidate members), Bulgaria, Paraguay, Yugoslavia (Full Members)

- 1998 41st Congress in Togo; Topic: Cash Crops and Agricultural dynamics

New Members: Zimbabwe, Senegal (Candidate members), Benin, Liberia, Mexico, Zambia (full members)

- 1999 42nd Congress in Norway and Sweden; Topic: Food and Health

New members: Belarus, Zimbabwe, Senegal (full members)

- 2000 43rd Congress in Mexico; Topic: The Water Issue
- 2001 44th Congress in Portugal; Topic: Sustainable Development

New members: Russia, Algeria, South Africa, Sri Lanka (Candidate Members)

- 2002 45th congress in Indonesia; Topic: Agribusiness now and then
- 2003 46th Congress in Belgium; Topic: Food Quality, a Challenge for North and South, in cooperation with the FAO
- 2004 47th Congress in Croatia and Italy; Topic: Culture, Tradition and Typical food: The Journey Through Mediterranean Agriculture, in cooperation with the FAO
- 2005 48th Congress in Togo and Ghana; Topic: Combating Hunger in developing countries: the role of Agricultural Research
- 2006 49th Congress in Malaysia (organized by IAAS Denmark); Topic: Sustainable Development – Environmental Protection and Agricultural Innovation
- 2007 50th Congress in Germany and Switzerland; Topic: Food Quality and Food Security – the challenge is ours!
- 2008 51st Congress in Belarus; Topic: Rural tourism as solution for employment, local development and environment: principles to practices
- 2009 52nd Congress in Mexico; Topic: Biodiversity now, Food for tomorrow
- 2010 53rd Congress in Indonesia; Topic: "The power of local resources to support food, energy and trade:food security, renewable resources, free trade"
- 2011 54th Congress in Macedonia; Topic: "Food identity"
- 2012 55th Congress in Belgium and Germany; Topic: "Face the Future! Agriculture from a Different Point of View"
- 2013 56th Congress in Chile; Topic: "Producing Food for the World"
- 2014 57th Congress in United States; Topic: "Farming for the Future"
- 2015 58th Congress in The Netherlands, Belgium, Switzerland and Italy; Topic: "How to feed the planet?"
- 2016 59th Congress in Indonesia; Topic: "Plant your future"
- 2017 60th Congress in Mexico; Topic : "Mexico 360"
- 2018 61st Congress in Croatia (Zagreb, Istria and Dalmatia); Topic : "Croatia, a Tale of Land and Water"
- 2019 62nd Congress in Côte d'Ivoire; Topic: "Flying towards Agricultural Transformation"
- 2020 63rd Congress ONLINE; Topic: "Evolving in times of crisis: Stepping up our IAAS community"
- 2021 64th Congress Hybrid in Turkey; Topic: "From Soils to the Spoon"
- 2022 65th Congress in Morocco; Topic: "Water Scarcity and its Effects on Food Security"
- 2023 66th Congress in Mexico; Topic: "Technology transfer and sustainability in food systems"
- 2024 67th Congress in Bangladesh; Topic: "Youth in Action: Challenges and Smart Solutions for Resilient Agro-food System"
- 2025 68th Congress in Switzerland/Italy; Topic: "From Switzerland to Italy: How Ecosystems Shape the Agri-Food Landscape"
- 2026 69th Congress in Turkiye; Topic: "Journey of Agriculture: From Anatolia to the World"

== Former Executive Boards ==
=== Executive Board of 2024/25 ===
- President: Alperen Özturk
- Vice President of Finance: Claudia Janampa
- Vice President of External Relations: Sagar Paudel
- Vice President of Communication: S M Riaz-us Saleheen
- Vice President of Exchange: Marco Vinicio López Castillo

=== Executive Board of 2023/24 ===
- President: Rabi Raut
- Vice President of Finance: Michele Tredeshini
- Vice President of External Relations: Prem Prakash Budhathoki
- Vice President of Communication: Anggela Artica
- Vice President of Exchange: Yassirys Sánchez

=== Executive Board of 2022/23 ===
- President: Thomas Westhoff
- Vice President of Finance: Marta Ciampechini
- Vice President of External Relations: Aya Mounier
- Vice President of Communication: Florence Oberlin
- Vice President of Exchange: Sarai Vega Cuevas

=== Executive Board of 2021/22 ===
- President: Septian Yosafat
- Vice President of Finance: Abdullah Al Maruf
- Vice President of External Relations: Thomas Westhoff
- Vice President of Communication: Eurike Junisha
- Vice President of Exchange: Andrea Calderon
