= International Students of History Association =

International organization for students, created in 1990

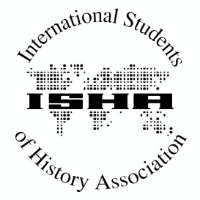
- Abbreviation: ISHA
- Formation: 1990
- Type: International Students' Association
- Legal status: Association
- Purpose: Educational / Academic
- Headquarters: Berlin, Germany
- Region served: Europe
- Members: Student Associations / Individuals
- Official language: English
- President: Elina Ziehm
- Main organ: General Assembly
- Website: ishainternational.wordpress.com

The International Students of History Association (ISHA) is an international non-governmental organization of students of history. Based and active mainly in Europe, ISHA's goals are to facilitate communication and provide a platform of exchange for students of history and related sciences on an international level.

ISHA was founded in Budapest in May 1990 thanks to the initiative of Hungarian history students who, after the fall of the Iron Curtain, wanted to forge links with their colleagues in Western Europe. At present, ISHA's members include more than 25 sections in fifteen European countries, and a number of observers and associate members, while ISHA is itself an associate member of the European Students' Union (ESU). Moreover, ISHA closely cooperates with a number of other academic networks, among them the Network of Concerned Historians, the European History Network and EUROCLIO, the European Association of History Educators, and The International Committee of Historical Sciences (ICHS), and the Right to Research Coalition (R2RC).

== Activities ==
Throughout the academic year, the various member sections take turns organizing several seminars and an Annual Conference. These events usually last five to seven days and take place with thirty to fifty (in case of the Annual Conference, up to a hundred) student participants from around Europe, and are hosted by different ISHA sections. They comprise workshops, discussions, lectures and presentations on varying topics, but also offer a cultural programme with visits and excursions. Additional leisure and evening activities are meant to provide more informal opportunities for participants to meet one another and thereby broaden their intercultural understandings.

=== Other activities ===
In 2009-10, ISHA took part in the project "Connecting Europe through History – Experiences and Perceptions of Migration in Europe", together with EUROCLIO and The Europaeum, an organization of ten leading European universities.

In 2016-17, ISHA took part in the EU-funded project "Learning a History that is 'not yet History'", together with EUROCLIO and several other partners. In 2017, EUROCLIO organized the public debate "How Can Europe Help the Balkans Consume its History?", hosted by the newly inaugurated House of European History in Brussels, in association with the Centre for Democracy and Reconciliation in South East Europe (CDRSEE) and ISHA.

In 2018, ISHA associated with the International Association of Physics Students (IAPS) in a Series of Interdisciplinary Conferences named HyPe (HistorY and Physics Experience). The first edition took place in Bologna, Italy, with the topic of "Nuclear Physics and History". A second edition of HyPe, titled "Space Matters", was organised in 2019 in Rome, Italy.

In addition, a number of Conferences have been co-organized with the European Geography Association (EGEA).

In 2022, after the cancellation of the annual conference because of the COVID 19 pandemic, General Elections were held in a New Year Seminar in Vienna, organized as a partnership with Central European University.

In 2026, ISHA organized a panel on student activism and student associations for the Centennial CISH Conference. In the same conference, ISHA president Elina Ziehm was elected a member of the CISH board, strengthening the bond between the two associations.

== Carnival ==
Carnival
- Discipline: History
- Language: English
- Edited by: Julia Boechat Machado

Publication details
- History: 1999-present
- Frequency: Annually
- Open access: Yes

Standard abbreviations
- ISO 4: Carnival

Indexing
- ISSN: 1457-1226
- OCLC no.: 897058540

Links
- Journal homepage

Since 1999, the association publishes its own annual journal, Carnival, a graduate student journal in which students of history and related sciences can publish articles of their own, regardless of ISHA affiliation. Submissions are peer-reviewed by a team of PhD students.

== Structure ==
The Association is organized around sections, or local chapters, that represent a city. Any city with an active member can become a section, and some are associated with local student organizations, such as Ffabula in the Czech Republic, Durf Doen in Belgium, and the Association of Finnish History Students in Finland. Sections send delegates to the Annual Conferences, where they constitute the General Assembly and elect the International Board, consisting of a President, one or more Vice-Presidents, a Secretary, and a Treasurer. The General Assembly also elects a Council, the Treasury Supervision, the editor-in-chief for Carnival, and an Archivist, responsible for maintaining the association's archives in the Ladeuze University Library of the KU Leuven.
