= Berlin Prize =

Fellowship by the American Academy in Berlin

- Awarded for: Scholarly and artistic projects of the highest merit
- Sponsored by: American Academy in Berlin
- Location: Hans Arnhold Center, Berlin
- Country: Germany
- Reward: Residential fellowship
- Website: https://www.americanacademy.de/

The Berlin Prize is a residential fellowship at the Hans Arnhold Center, awarded by the American Academy in Berlin to scholars and artists. Each year, about 20 fellows are selected.

The stated mission of the program is to improve the transatlantic dialogue in the arts, humanities, and public policy through the development and communication of projects of the highest scholarly merit.

The program is privately funded through donations, with the Kellen-Arnhold family as Academy's primary source of financial support.

== History ==
The creation of the Academy and the program was driven by Richard C. Holbrooke, an American diplomat who served as U.S. Ambassador to Germany towards the waning days of the Cold War. As the last of the American troops were leaving Berlin, Holbrooke proposed the academy as a way of maintaining U.S-German ties. The academy was created in 1994 and the first class of fellows were brought in September 1998.

Recipients come from a wide range of academic fields and have included anthropologists, art historians, historians, philosophers, musicologists, sociologists, legal scholars, and economists, among others.

== Eligibility ==
Fellows must based permanently in the United States, though are not required to be U.S. citizens. American expatriates are explicitly stated to not be eligible.

Academic candidates are expected to have completed a doctorate at the time of application, whereas applicants working in fields such as journalism, filmmaking, or public policy must have equivalent professional degrees or experience. Writers must have published at least one book.

== Previous Berlin Prize Fellows ==
Year	Winner	Work	Location
Fall 2016-Spring 2017	Tom Franklin	Novelist, Assoc. Professor, Department of English, University of Mississippi, Oxford	Mississippi
Fall 2016-Spring 2017	Michael Watts	Professor Emeritus, Department of Geography, University of California, Berkeley	California
Spring 2015	Mary Jo Bang	Professor of English, Washington University in St. Louis	Missouri
Fall 2015	Jason Pine	Assistant Professor of Anthropology and Media Studies, Purchase College, State University of New York
Fall 2015	Anthony Marra	Writer and Jones Lecturer in Fiction, Stanford University
Spring 2013	Sinan Antoon	Assistant Professor, Gallatin School of Individualized Study, New York University	New York
Spring 2013	J.M. Bernstein	University Distinguished Professor of Philosophy, New School for Social Research	New York
Spring 2013	Gene Coleman	Composer, musician and director	New Jersey
Spring 2013	William Cordova	Interdisciplinary cultural practitioner	New York
Spring 2013	Charles Hirschkind	Associate professor, Department of Anthropology, University of California at Berkeley	California
Spring 2013	Donald L. Horowitz	James B. Duke Professor of Law and Political Science, Duke University	North Carolina
Spring 2013	Thomas DaCosta Kaufmann	Frederick Marquand Professor of Art and Archaeology, Princeton University	New Jersey
Spring 2013	Susie Linfield	Associate professor of journalism; director, Cultural Reporting and Criticism Program, New York University	New York
Spring 2013	Béatrice Longuenesse	Silver Professor of Philosophy, New York University	New York
Spring 2013	Saba Mahmood	Associate professor, Department of Anthropology, University of California at Berkeley	California
Spring 2013	Lance Olsen	Professor of Literature and Creative Writing, University of Utah	Utah
Spring 2013	Ronald Suny	Charles Tilly Collegiate Professor of Social and Political History, University of Michigan	Michigan
Spring 2013	Francesca Trivellato	Frederick W. Hilles Professor of History, Yale University	Connecticut
Fall 2012	Joan Acocella	Staff writer, The New Yorker
Fall 2012	Daniel Albright	Ernest Bernbaum Professor of Literature, Harvard University	Massachusetts
Fall 2012	David Bollier	Author, activist and co-founder Commons Strategies Group
Fall 2012	Peter Constantine	Literary translator, New York	New York
Fall 2012	Richard Hawkins	Visual Artist, Los Angeles	California
Fall 2012	Jonathan Laurence	Associate professor of political science, Boston College	Massachusetts
Fall 2012	Béatrice Longuenesse	Silver Professor of Philosophy, New York University	New York
Fall 2012	Heather McGowan	Writer, Brooklyn	New York
Fall 2012	Dean Moyar	Associate professor of philosophy, Johns Hopkins University	Maryland
Fall 2012	Celina Su	Associate professor of political science, City University of New York	New York
Fall 2012	Daniel N. Tiffany	Professor of English and Comparative Literature, University of Southern California	California
Fall 2012	Hans R. Vaget	Helen & Laura Shedd Professor Emeritus of German Studies, Smith College	Massachusetts
Fall 2012	Michael A. Wachtel	Chair and Professor of Slavic Languages and Literatures, Princeton University	New Jersey
Spring 2012	Karen Alter	Professor of Political Science and Law, Northwestern University
Spring 2012	Jay Bernstein	University Distinguished Professor of Philosophy, New School for Social Research
Spring 2012	Charles Bright	Arthur J. Thurnau Professor of History, University of Michigan
Spring 2012	Leland de la Durantaye	Gardner Cowles Associate Professor of English, Harvard University
Spring 2012	Martin Dimitrov	Associate Professor of Political Science, Tulane University
Spring 2012	Michael Geyer	Samuel N. Harper Professor of German and European History, and Faculty Director, Human Rights Program, University of Chicago
Spring 2012	Annie Gosfield	Composer	New York
Spring 2012	Avery Gordon	Professor of Sociology, University of California, Santa Barbara
Spring 2012	Leslie Hewitt	Artist	New York
Spring 2012	Peter Lindseth	Olimpiad S. Ioffe Professor of International and Comparative Law, University of Connecticut School of Law
Spring 2012	Inga Markovits	Friends of Jamail Regents Chair in Law, University of Texas School of Law
Spring 2012	Karen Russell	Visiting Professor of Creative Writing, Bryn Mawr College
Spring 2012	M. Norton Wise	Distinguished Professor of History, University of California, Los Angeles
Fall 2011	Jennifer Culbert	Associate professor of political science, Johns Hopkins University The Jurisprudence of Hannah Arendt	Maryland
Fall 2011	Leland de la Durantaye	Gardner Cowles Associate Professor of English, Harvard University Wörterstürmerei im Namen der Schönheit, or World and Work in Samuel Beckett	Massachusetts
Fall 2011	James Der Derian	Professor of International Studies (Research), Brown University Human Terrain: When War Becomes Academic	Rhode Island
Fall 2011	Alice Eagly	Professor of Psychology, James Padilla Chair of Arts and Sciences, and Faculty Fellow, Institute for Policy Research, Northwestern University The Evolutionary Origins of the Psychology of Women and Men	Illinois
Fall 2011	Adam Haslett	Writer Kindness: A Novel	New York
Fall 2011	Daniel Hobbins	Associate professor of History, Ohio State University Origins of Print: How Medieval Culture Ushered in the First Media Revolution	Ohio
Fall 2011	Susan McCabe	Professor of English, University of Southern California Bryher: Female Husband of Modernism	California
Fall 2011	Geoffrey O'Brien	Editor-in-Chief, Library of America America Before the Code	New York
Fall 2011	Paul Pfeiffer	Artist	New York
Fall 2011	Elizabeth Povinelli	Professor of Anthropology and Gender Studies, Columbia University Geontologies: Indigenous Worlds in the New Media and Late Liberalism	New York
Fall 2011	Tom Sleigh	Poet and Distinguished Professor, Hunter College New Poems	New York
Fall 2011	John Van Engen	Andrew V. Tackes Professor of History, University of Notre Dame Europe's Twelfth-Century "Turn", Narrative of Medieval History	Indiana
Spring 2011	James Der Derian	Professor of International Studies (Research), Brown University	Rhode Island
Spring 2011	Astrid M. Eckert	Assistant professor of Modern German History, Emory University,	Georgia
Spring 2011	Hal Foster	Townsend Martin 1917 Professor of Art and Archaeology, Princeton University,	New Jersey
Spring 2011	Rivka Galchen	Writer,	New York
Spring 2011	Todd Gitlin	Professor of Journalism and Sociology, Columbia University,	New York
Spring 2011	Pieter M. Judson	Professor of History, Swarthmore College,	Pennsylvania
Spring 2011	Ellen Kennedy	Professor of Political Science, University of Pennsylvania,	Pennsylvania
Spring 2011	Dave McKenzie	Artist,	New York
Spring 2011	H. C. Erik Midelfort	Professor Emeritus of History and Religious Studies, University of Virginia,	Virginia
Spring 2011	Norman M. Naimark	Robert and Florence McDonnell Professor in East European Studies, Stanford University,	California
Spring 2011	David B. Ruderman	Joseph Meyerhoff Professor of Modern Jewish History, University of Pennsylvania,	Pennsylvania
Spring 2011	P. Adams Sitney	Professor of Visual Arts, Princeton University,	New Jersey
Spring 2011	Ken Ueno	Assistant Professor of Music, University of California at Berkeley,	California
Fall 2010	Brigid Cohen	Assistant Professor of Music, University of North Carolina,	?North Carolina
Fall 2010	Stanley Corngold	Professor Emeritus of German and Comparative Literature, Princeton University,	New Jersey
Fall 2010	Aaron Curry	Sculptor,	California
Fall 2010	Laura Engelstein	Henry S. McNeil Professor of History, Yale University,	Connecticut
Fall 2010	Catherine Gallagher	Eggers Professor of English Literature, University of California at Berkeley,	California
Fall 2010	Anne Hull	Journalist, The Washington Post	Washington, DC
Fall 2010	Tamar Jacoby	President and CEO, Immigration Works USA,	New York
Fall 2010	Martin Jay	Sidney Hellman Ehrman Professor of History, University of California at Berkeley,	California
Fall 2010	Kirk Johnson	Executive Director, The List Project to Resettle Iraqi Allies,	New York
Fall 2010	Han Ong	Novelist, New York,	New York
Fall 2010	Ken Ueno	Assistant professor of music, University of California at Berkeley,	California
Fall 2010	James Wood	Staff writer, The New Yorker, and Professor of the Practice of Literary Criticism, Harvard University,	Massachusetts
Fall 2010	John Wray	Writer,	New York City
Spring 2010	David Abraham (law professor)	Professor of Immigration and Citizenship Law, University of Miami School of Law	Florida
Spring 2010	Leonard Barkan	Class of 1943 University Professor, Department of Comparative Literature, Princeton University	New Jersey
Spring 2010	Janet Gezari	Lucy Marsh Haskell '19 Professor of English, Connecticut College	Connecticut
Spring 2010	Francisco Goldman	Allen K. Smith Professor of Literature and Creative Writing, Trinity College, Hartford	Connecticut
Spring 2010	Sunil Khilnani	Starr Foundation Professor and Director of the South Asia Studies Program, The Johns Hopkins University	Washington, DC
Spring 2010	Charles Marsh	Professor of Religious Studies, University of Virginia	Virginia
Spring 2010	Andrew J. Norman	Composer	New York
Spring 2010	Michael Queenland	Artist	New York
Spring 2010	Jeffrey Chipps	Smith Kay Fortson Chair in European Art, University of Texas	Austin Texas
Spring 2010	Alexander Star	Deputy editor, New York Times Magazine	New York
Spring 2010	Camilo Jose Vergara	Writer, photographer, documentarian	New York
Spring 2010	Amy Waldman	Writer and journalist	New York
Spring 2010	Judith Wechsler	National Endowment for the Humanities Professor, Art and Art History Department, Tufts University	Massachusetts
Spring 2010	Peter Wortsman	Translator-writer	New York
Fall 2009	Rick Atkinson	Author and historian	Washington, DC
Fall 2009	Leonard Barkan	Class of 1943 University Professor, Department of Comparative Literature, Princeton University	New Jersey
Fall 2009	Benjamin H. D. Buchloh	Andrew W. Mellon Professor of Modern Art, Harvard University	Massachusetts
Fall 2009	Nathan Englander	Writer	New York
Fall 2009	Joel Harrington	Associate provost for global strategy and professor of history; Vanderbilt University	Tennessee
Fall 2009	Jochen Hellbeck	Associate professor of History, Rutgers University	New Jersey
Fall 2009	Susan Howe	Poet	Connecticut
Fall 2009	Peter Maass	Contributing writer, New York Times magazine	New York
Fall 2009	Andrew J. Norman	Composer	New York
Fall 2009	George Packer	Journalist, The New Yorker	New York
Fall 2009	Michael Queenland	Artist	New York
Fall 2009	Mary Sarotte	Professor of International Relations, University of Southern California	California
Fall 2009	Laura Secor	Journalist	New York
Fall 2009	Philip Zelikow	White Burkett Miller Professor of History, University of Virginia, and former Counselor, US Department of State	Washington, DC
Spring 2009	Donald Antrim	Writer	New York, New York
Spring 2009	Edward Dimendberg	Associate professor of Film and Media Studies, University of California, Irvine	California
Spring 2009	Michael Dobbs	Former foreign correspondent, The Washington Post, and cold-war historian	Washington, DC
Spring 2009	Devin Fore	Assistant professor for German Studies, Princeton University	New Jersey
Spring 2009	Donald Kommers	Joseph and Elizabeth Robbie Professor of Political Science, Professor of Law, University of Notre Dame Law School	Indiana
Spring 2009	Juliet Koss	Associate professor of Art History, Scripps College	California
Spring 2009	Charles Lane	Journalist, The Washington Post	Washington, DC
Spring 2009	Adrian Nicole	LeBlanc Writer, New York University School of Journalism	New York
Spring 2009	Mitchell Merback	Associate professor of Art History, Johns Hopkins University	Maryland
Spring 2009	Susan Pedersen	Professor of History, Columbia University	New York
Spring 2009	Jed Rasula	Professor of English, University of Georgia	Georgia
Spring 2009	Amy Sillman	Artist	New York
Spring 2009	Daniel Visconti	Composer	Virginia
Fall 2008	Joel Agee	Writer	New York New York
Fall 2008	Leora Auslander	Professor of European Social History, University of Chicago	Illinois
Fall 2008	Patty Chang	Artist	New York New York
Fall 2008	Heide Fehrenbach	Presidential Research Professor, Northern Illinois University	Illinois
Fall 2008	Juliet Floyd	Professor of Philosophy, Boston University	Massachusetts
Fall 2008	Thomas Holt	James Westfall Thompson Professor of American and African American History, University of Chicago	Illinois
Fall 2008	Ha Jin	Professor of English, Boston University	Massachusetts
Fall 2008	David Sabean	Professor of History, University of California, Los Angeles	California
Fall 2008	Angela Stent	Professor at the School of Foreign Service and Director of the Center for Eurasian, Russian and East European Studies, Georgetown University	Washington, DC
Fall 2008	Daniel Visconti	Composer	Virginia
Spring 2008	Anne Applebaum	Columnist and editorial board member, The Washington Post	Washington, DC
Spring 2008	Nicholas Eberstadt	Henry Wendt Scholar in Political Economy, American Enterprise Institute	Washington, DC
Spring 2008	Mitch Epstein	Photographer	New York
Spring 2008	Claire Finkelstein	Professor of Law and Philosophy, University of Pennsylvania Law School	Pennsylvania
Spring 2008	Kenneth Gross	Professor of English, University of Rochester	New York
Spring 2008	Gregg Horowitz	Associate professor of philosophy, Vanderbilt University	Tennessee
Spring 2008	David L. Lewis	Julius Silver University Professor and professor of history, New York University	New York
Spring 2008	David Mayers	Professor and chair of political science, Boston University	Massachusetts
Spring 2008	Collier Schorr	Photographer	New York
Spring 2008	Elizabeth Sears	Professor of Art History, University of Michigan	Michigan
Spring 2008	Sean Shepherd	Composer	New York
Spring 2008	Steven Simon	Hasib J. Sabbagh Senior Fellow for Middle Eastern Studies, Council on Foreign Relations	New York
Fall 1999	Laura Schwendinger	Music Composition Fellow	Madison Wisconsin
