= Peter Lindseth =

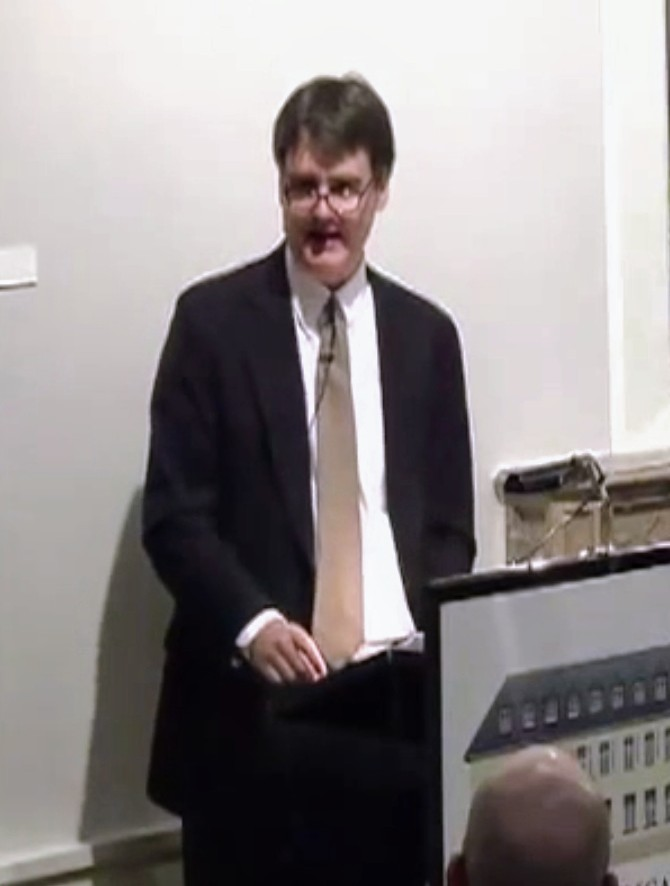
- Peter Lindseth in 2012
- Awards: Berlin Prize

Peter Lindseth is Olimpiad S. Ioffe Professor of International and Comparative Law at the University of Connecticut. He is the recipient of the 2012 Daimler Berlin Prize and is a Fellow at the American Academy in Berlin.

== Life ==
He graduated from Cornell University with a B.A. and J.D., and from Columbia University with a Ph.D.

He was a visiting professor at Princeton University, and Yale University.

== Works ==
- Power and Legitimacy: Reconciling Europe and the Nation-State, Oxford University Press, 2010, ISBN 978-0-19-539014-8
- Susan Rose-Ackerman; Peter L. Lindseth, eds. (2010). Comparative Administrative Law. Edward Elgar Publishing. ISBN 978-1-84844-642-7.
- Administrative Law of the European Union: Oversight, with Alfred C. Aman and Alan C. Raul; George Bermann, et al., series eds.; ABA Publishing 2008, ISBN 978-1-60442-141-5
- Transatlantic Regulatory Cooperation: Legal Problems and Political Prospects, co-editor with George Bermann and Matthias Herdegen; Oxford University Press 2000
- "Agents Without Principals?: Delegation in an Age of Diffuse and Fragmented Governance", in Reframing Self-Regulation in European Private Law, Fabrizio Cafaggi, ed.; Kluwer Law International, 2006
- Christian Joerges; Bo Stråth; Peter Wagner, eds. (2005). "'Always Embedded' Administration: the Historical Evolution of Administrative Justice as an Aspect of Modern Governance". The Economy as a Polity: the Political Constitution of Contemporary Capitalism. UCL Press. ISBN 978-1-84472-070-5.
- Christian Joerges; Renaud Dehouse, eds. (2002). "Delegation is Dead, Long Live Delegation: Managing the Democratic Disconnect in the European Market-Polity". Good Governance in Europe's Integrated Market. Oxford University Press. ISBN 978-0-19-924608-3.
