= John Wray (novelist) =

American novelist (born 1971)

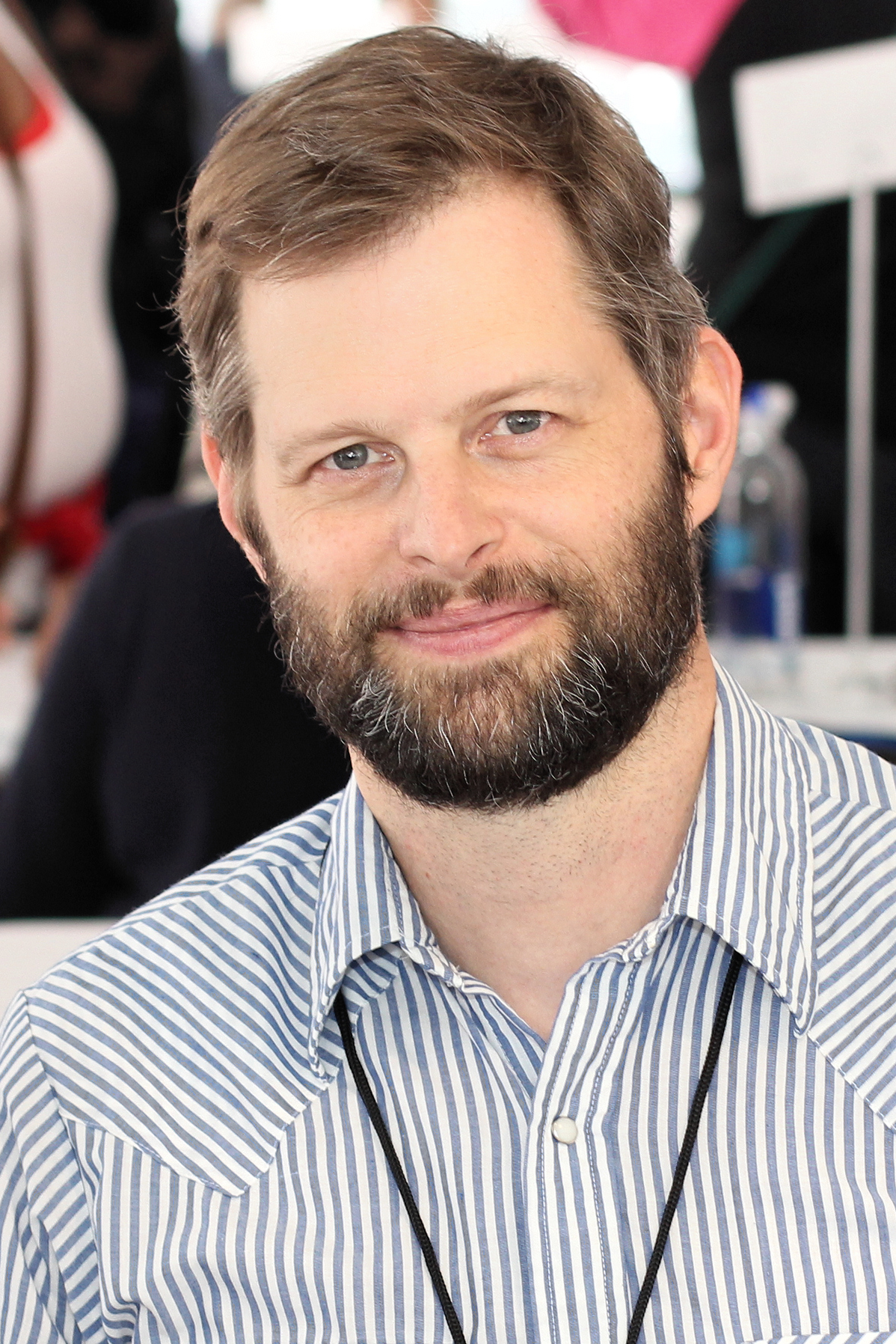
Wray at the 2018 Texas Book Festival

John Henderson (born 1971), better known by his pen name John Wray, is an American novelist and regular contributor to The New York Times Magazine. Born in Washington, D.C., of an American father and Austrian mother, he is a citizen of both countries. He grew up in Buffalo, New York, attended the Nichols School for his high school education, and then graduated from Oberlin College, majoring in Biology. He dropped out of graduate school twice: first from New York University's M.F.A. program in poetry, where he won an Academy of American Poets Prize, and then, a few years later, from Columbia University's fiction program. He currently lives in New York City.

== Work ==
Wray's first novel, The Right Hand of Sleep, (Knopf, 2001) received positive reviews and was awarded a Whiting Award.

His second novel Canaan's Tongue (2005) is based on the legend of the preacher John Murrell, described by Mark Twain in Life on the Mississippi. In connection with his second novel, he did a 600-mile tour by raft on the Mississippi River in 2005. In 2007 Wray was chosen by Granta magazine as one of the "Best of Young American Novelists".

His third novel, Lowboy (Farrar Straus & Giroux, 2008), is narrated by 16-year-old William Heller, a schizophrenic who has just escaped a mental institution and is in flight through the subways of Manhattan.

His fourth novel, The Lost Time Accidents (Farrar Straus & Giroux, 2016), chronicles a century in the life of a family of eccentric physicists, time travelers and cult leaders, and incorporates elements of science fiction and fantasy in its plot.

His fifth novel, Godsend (Farrar Straus & Giroux, 2018), was inspired by the story of John Walker Lindh. It follows 18-year-old Aden Sawyer, who runs away and disguises herself as a man to study Islam in Pakistan.

Wray was also frontman of the Brooklyn band Marmalade, which released the album Beautiful Soup in 2003. As part of the promotional activities surrounding the release of Lowboy, he recorded subway musicians for a Lowboy MP3 soundtrack.

He is a recipient of the 2010/2011 Berlin Prize Fellowship from the American Academy in Berlin.

=== Novels ===
- Wray, John (2002). The Right Hand of Sleep. New York: Vintage. ISBN 0-375-70640-2. OCLC 49887233.
- Wray, John (2005). Canaan's Tongue. New York: Alfred A. Knopf. ISBN 1-4000-4086-8. OCLC 57391998.
- Wray, John (2009). Lowboy. New York: Farrar Straus and Giroux. ISBN 978-0-374-19416-1. OCLC 225852495.
- Wray, John (2017). The Lost Time Accidents. New York: Picador Usa. ISBN 978-1-250-11798-4. OCLC 945482939.
- Wray, John (2018). Godsend: A Novel. New York: Farrar, Straus and Giroux. ISBN 978-0-374-16470-6. OCLC 1019836451.
- Wray, John (2023). Gone to the Wolves: A Novel. New York: Picador. ISBN 978-0-374-60333-5.

== Awards ==
- 2001 – Whiting Award
- 2009 – Guggenheim Fellowship
- 2010 – Berlin Prize
- 2011 – KEN Fiction Award
- 2017 – Deutschlandfunk Prize of the Festival of German-Language Literature
