= Alice Eagly =

Professor of psychology and of management

- Born: Alice Hendrickson; 1938 (age 87–88); Los Angeles, California, U.S.
- Other name: Alice H. Eagly
- Awards: Distinguished Scientific Contribution Award from the American Psychological Association; Gold Medal for Life Achievement in the Science of Social Psychology from the American Psychological Foundation; Raymond A. Katzell Award from the Society for Industrial and Organization Psychology; 2011 Berlin Prize from the American Academy in Berlin

Academic background
- Education: Harvard University (B.A.); University of Michigan (M.A., Ph.D.)
- Doctoral advisor: Herbert Kelman

Academic work
- Discipline: Psychology
- Sub-discipline: Social psychology, personality psychology, Industrial Organizational Psychology
- Institutions: Northwestern University; Michigan State University; University of Massachusetts; Purdue University; University of Illinois (visiting); Harvard University (visiting); University of Tübingen (visiting); University of Amsterdam (visiting); University of Southern California (visiting)
- Doctoral students: Shelly Chaiken

Alice H. Eagly (born 1938) is an American psychologist and the James Padilla Chair of Arts and Sciences Emerita and emerita professor of psychology at Northwestern University. She is also a fellow at the Institute of Policy Research at Northwestern University. Her primary research focus is social psychology, as well as personality psychology and Industrial Organizational Psychology. She was elected as a member of the National Academy of Sciences in 2022.

== Early life and education ==
Eagly was born as Alice Hendrickson in 1938, in Los Angeles, to Harold and Josara Hendrickson. She completed her undergraduate degree at Harvard University in Social Relations in 1960. She received her M.A. in psychology and her Ph.D. in social psychology from the University of Michigan. She also holds two honorary doctorates: from the University of Bern (Bern, Switzerland) and from Erasmus University (Rotterdam, Netherlands).

In 1962, she married Robert Eagly, who she had met while studying in Norway. Although the two had not planned to reverse social roles, this became their lifestyle after Eagly succeeded further in her career and they concluded that Robert would become the stay-at-home parent. This lifestyle change exemplifies the social role studies that Eagly was very much involved in.

== Career ==
Eagly has held teaching positions at several universities including Northwestern University, Michigan State University, University of Massachusetts, and Purdue University, as well as visiting positions at University of Illinois, Harvard University, University of Tübingen, University of Amsterdam, and University of Southern California. She has written or contributed to 7 books and over 100 journal articles.

== Research ==
=== Social role theory ===
Eagly developed the social role theory which attributes current sex differences to the labor division between men and women. While conducting research pertaining to the Social Role Theory, Eagly was a member of an observation team that explored stereotype content. To begin this research, they collected data on the development of stereotypes through observations and preliminary research of participants' beliefs. These beliefs were then compared to various members of social groups.

Within this theory, Eagly compares gender differences and stereotypes, which have the potential to lead to prejudice. Prejudices are formed when individuals hold stereotypes about a social group that does not agree with the attributes that are typically perceived as being required for success in certain social roles. Eagly uses much of her research to show that discrimination happens when the individual steps outside of the given stereotype ascribed to their group. This is a basis for much of her research on gender discrimination and stereotypes.

According to Eagly, an attitude is made of evaluation, attitude object, and tendency. Evaluation encompasses all aspects of reacting inwardly or outwardly and to react based upon a believed feeling or emotion. An attitude object is anything that can cause a reaction in an individual. Tendency is formed through past experiences. Each individual has their own attitude based on these three components that resonate with others' attitudes in order to form similar patterns of thought and stereotypes.

One of her most important contributions to the field of psychology is her theory on role congruity, the belief that prejudice arises when one social groups' stereotype mismatches their valued success in other social roles, specifically among men and women. That is, society views one social group's role to be exclusive to that group in particular, and that venturing outside this could not be a successful endeavor, thus creating prejudicial attitudes. Eagly explores this idea in her research to show that the attributes ascribed to the group are not necessarily negative, but just different from that which is assumed of the group.

A stereotype that Eagly spent time studying was physical beauty and levels of attractiveness. This stereotype is composed of physical attractiveness, media content, and social attention given to those with certain outward characteristics. Due to the fact that society as a whole has been seen through studies as more accepting of physically attractive individuals, the stereotype has formed that they also hold characteristics and attributes that are positive and favorable.

Eagly has contributed several notable studies to the body of research on sex differences. For example, her work in the area of mate preferences showed that men and women who held more traditional gender ideologies preferred more gender stereotypical qualities in a partner. Women with more traditional attitudes looked for older mates while more traditional men sought younger mates, compared to males and females who reported less traditional gender ideologies. In an additional study, Eagly found that participant's mate-preferences could be shifted by asking them to see themselves in different marital roles. When instructed to envision oneself in the provider role, participants placed a greater emphasis on a mate's homemaking skills and the preferred age for the mate decreased. She also found, however, that changing one's expected marital role could not eliminate gender differences in preference for earning potential; women consistently looked for a greater earning potential in a mate compared to men.

Other research that Eagly participated in looks at women who were highly educated and their anticipated marital roles. This study shows that these women anticipated inequality in areas such as employment hours, salary, housework and childcare in comparison to the amount of work that they expected their husbands to do. Further research in this study also shows that women who anticipated greater employment opportunities showed a general decrease in gender role assumptions, but also felt that they felt their relationships with their family and emotional well-being would be affected adversely.

This theory emphasizes the social component of sex differences. It operates around the idea of correspondence inference, which is the tendency to ascribe a person's behavior to her or his disposition or personality and to underestimate the extent to which situational factors elicited the behavior. Eagly suggests that men and women were constrained to certain roles in the work force and then assumed to embody the psychological characteristics of those roles without exception.

Women and men can be classified by differing prosocial behaviors. These behaviors are categorized as communion or agency. Communal traits are identified as concerned with others, friendly, unselfish and emotionally expressive; these communal traits are more commonly associated with females. Agentic traits are identified as dominant, competitive, and assertive, and are associated more commonly with males.

=== Feminism ===
According to Eagly's studies, she refers to the differences found in gender stated as male or female due to the standard XX or XY chromosomes present. When working with the feminist theory, Eagly introduces the biosocial theory that considers the division of labor as a core principle. She also believes that when considering feminism and science there are not specifically congruent ideas that point to sameness when considering the biological differences between men and women. Eagly stands for accuracy and interpreting scientific data in order to be used when making these comparisons.

When it comes to leadership, while considering feminism, neither men nor women have an inherent advantage when it comes to style or effectiveness. There are many traits that are associated with being a good leader that may be classified as feminine characteristics, such as kindness and concern for others. While these traits may describe the feminine attitude with more depth, they may also be a shortcoming. Eagly states that women must have these caring traits while also be willing to show confidence and assertion, which many find to be incompatible.

== Selected works ==
- Eagly, A. H., & Chaiken, S. (1993). The psychology of attitudes. Fort Worth, TX: Harcourt Brace Jovanovich.
- Eagly, A. H., Baron, R. M., & Hamilton, V. L. (Eds.). (2004). The social psychology of group identity and social conflict: Theory, application, and practice. Washington, DC: APA Books.
- Eagly, A. H., Beall, A., & Sternberg, R. S. (Eds.). (2004). The psychology of gender (2nd ed.). New York: Guilford Press.
- Eagly, A. H., & Carli, L. L. (2007). Through the labyrinth: The truth about how women become leaders. Boston, MA: Harvard Business School Press.
- Eagly, A. H., & Sczesny, S. (Eds.). (2019). Gender roles in the future? Theoretical foundations and future research directions. Frontiers Media.

== Honors and awards ==
- Distinguished Scientific Contribution Award from the American Psychological Association
- Gold Medal for Life Achievement in the Science of Social Psychology from the American Psychological Foundation
- Raymond A. Katzell Award from the Society for Industrial and Organization Psychology
- 2011 Berlin Prize from the American Academy in Berlin
