= La Durantaye =

La Durantaye may refer to:

- La Durantaye, Quebec, a parish municipality, in Chaudière-Appalaches, Quebec, in Canada
- Olivier Morel de La Durantaye (1640–1716), an officer of New France
- Leland de la Durantaye (born 1972), a professor of comparative literature
