= Claire Finkelstein =

American academic

- Occupation: Law professor
- Title: Algernon Biddle Professor of Law and Professor of Philosophy; Director of the University of Pennsylvania Carey Law School Center for Ethics and the Rule of Law
- Awards: American Academy in Berlin, Berlin Prize (2008)

Academic background
- Education: Harvard University (BA); Sorbonne University (MA); Yale University (JD); University of Pittsburgh (PhD)

Academic work
- Institutions: University of Pennsylvania Carey Law School

Claire Finkelstein is the Algernon Biddle Professor of Law and Professor of Philosophy at the University of Pennsylvania Carey Law School, and the Founder and Director of its Center for Ethics and the Rule of Law.

== Biography ==
Finkelstein attended Harvard College (B.A. 1986), the University of Paris, Sorbonne ("Maîtrise" (Masters) in philosophy 1987), Columbia Law School (first year of J.D., 1987–1988), Yale Law School (J.D. 1993, Articles Editor, Yale Law Journal), and the University of Pittsburgh (Department of Philosophy, Ph.D. 1996).

She taught law initially at the University of California, Berkeley (Boalt Hall).

She then taught at the University of Pennsylvania Carey Law School, where Finkelstein is the Algernon Biddle Professor of Law and Professor of Philosophy at the University of Pennsylvania Carey Law School, and the founder (in 2012) and Director of its Center for Ethics and the Rule of Law. She is a Senior Fellow at the Foreign Policy Research Institute. She is co-editor of The Oxford Series in Ethics, National Security, and the Rule of Law, and a volume editor of its titles.

In 2008 Finkelstein was an American Academy in Berlin, Siemens Fellow, Berlin Prize Winner.
