= International Committee of Historical Sciences =

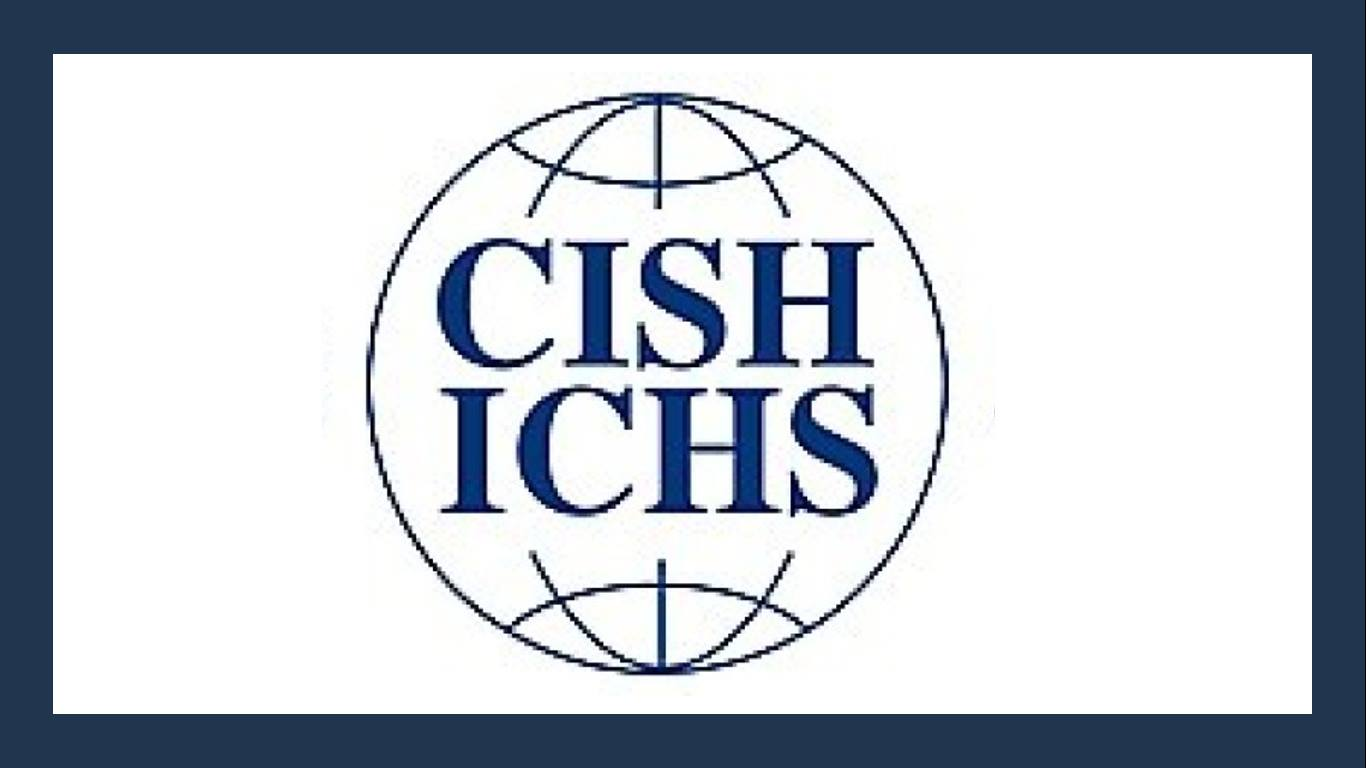
International Committee of Historical Sciences

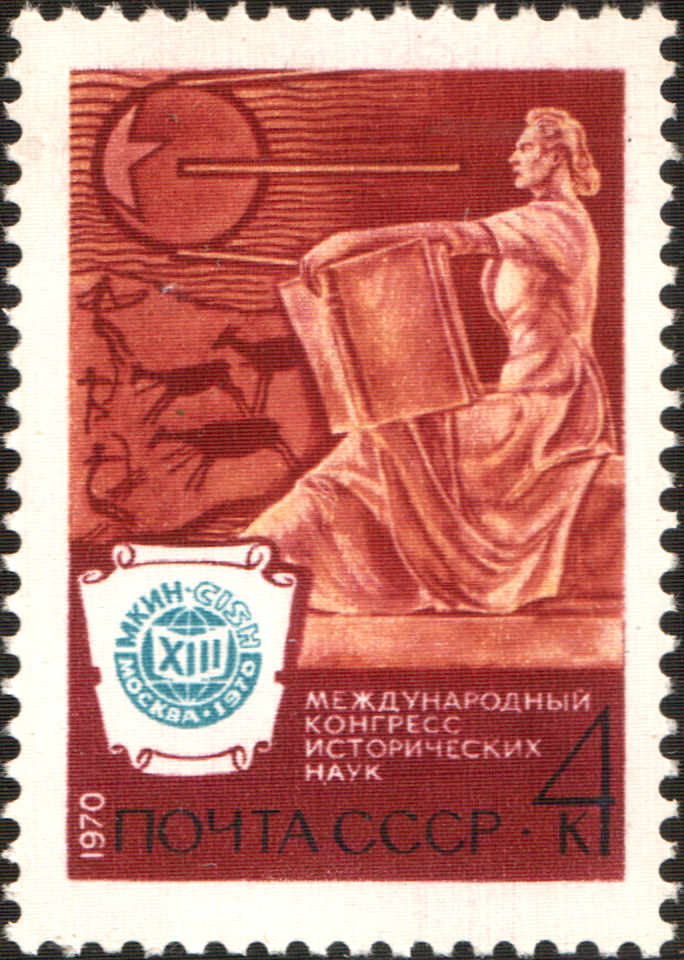
13th CISH congress in Moscow on 1970 postage stamp of the Soviet Union

The International Committee of Historical Sciences / Comité international des Sciences historiques (ICHS / CISH) is the international association of historical scholarship. It was established as a non-governmental organization in Geneva on May 14, 1926. CISH was founded as an association within the meaning of articles 60 and following of the Civil Code of Switzerland, created in order to promote the historical sciences through international co-operation.

The initiative to create the ICHS was taken in 1923.

It organizes every five years, in collaboration with the National Committee of the historians of the host country, an International Congress of Historical Sciences. It sets the date of the congress and determines its programme. It may handle, patronize or support financially the publication of reference works of general interest and the organization of scientific symposia or of other events encouraging the spread of historical thought and knowledge. It shall defend freedom of thought and expression in the field of historical research and teaching, and is opposed to the misuse of history and shall use every means at its disposal to ensure the ethical professional conduct of its members.

The most recent Congress (23rd) took place in Poznań (Poland) on August 21–27, 2022. The 24th Congress is planned for July 2028 in Jerusalem.

The current board is composed by Catherine Horel (Centre national de la recherche scientifique, Université Paris 1 Panthéon-Sorbonne) as President, Eliana Dutra (University of Minas Gerais) and Krzysztof Makowski University of Poznan as vice-presidents, Edoardo Tortarolo (University of Eastern Piedmont) as secretary general, Sacha Zala (Bern University) as treasurer, Andrea Giardina, Joel Harrington (Vanderbilt University), Matthias Middell (University of Leipzig), Hirotaka Watanabe (Teikyo University), Gunlög Fur (Linnaeus University), Nuno Gonçalo Monteiro (Universidade de Lisboa), Katalin Szende (Central European University)

It awards the CISH History Prize to a "historian who has distinguished herself or himself in the field of history by her/his works, publications or teaching, and has significantly contributed to the development of historical knowledge". In 2024 the prize will go to Laura de Mello e Souza.

== Bibliography ==
- Karl Dietrich Erdmann, Toward Global Community of Historians. The International Congresses and the International Committee of historical sciences 1898–2000, Berghahn Books, 2005.
