= Milad Doueihi =

American historian

Milad Doueihi (born 1959) is a Syrian-Lebanese cultural and intellectual historian. He is Professor of Digital Humanities at Paris-Sorbonne University.

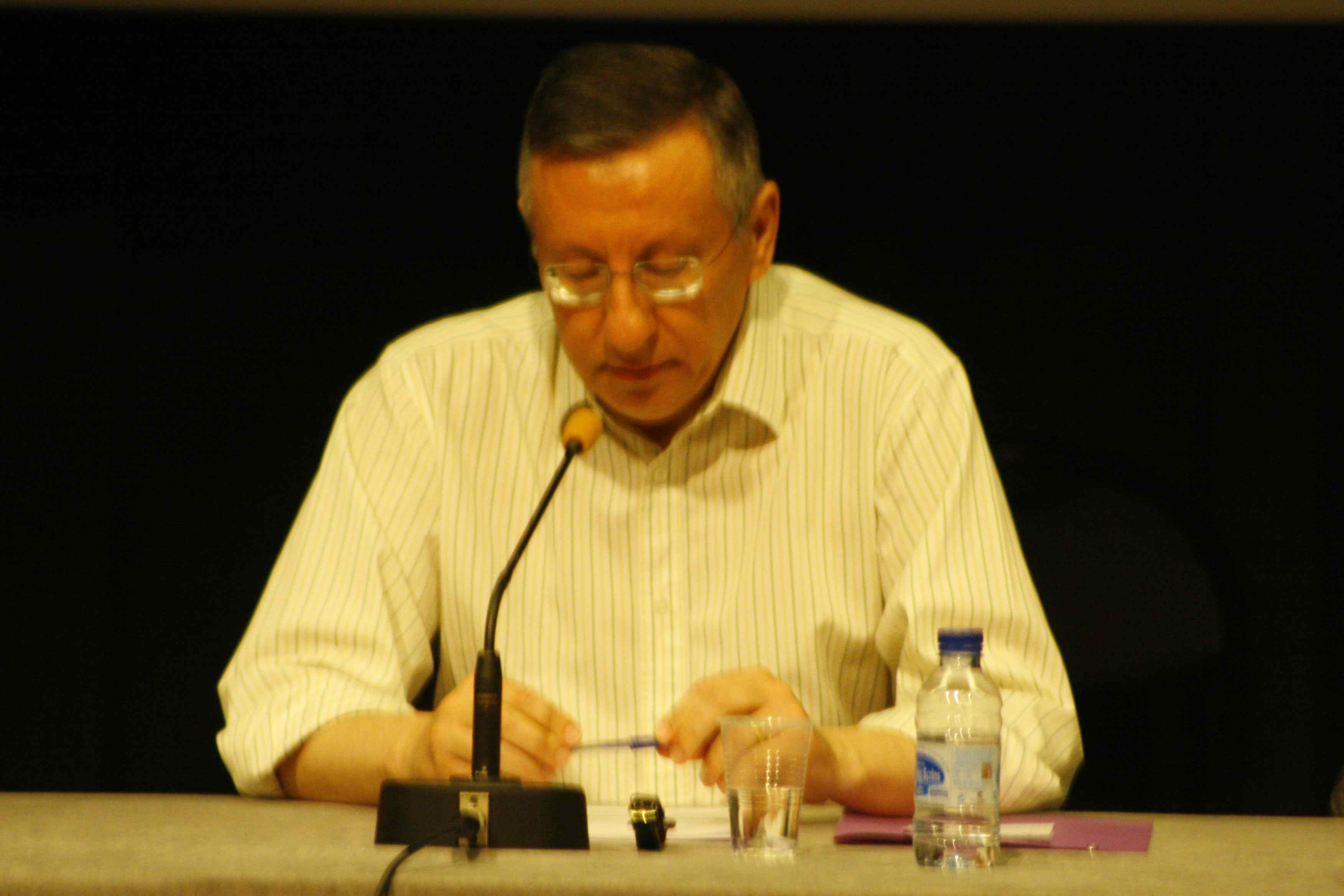
Milad Doueihi at a conference in Paris (April 2010)

== Life ==
Doueihi was Directeur d'Études Associé at the École des Hautes Études en Sciences Sociales in Paris. In 2000 he was a Prize Fellow at the American Academy in Berlin.

== Works ==
- 'The Traps of Representation', Diacritics 14:1 (Spring 1984), pp. 66–77
- (ed.) The Metis of the Greeks. Diacritics 16:2 (Summer 1986)
- (ed.) Hoc est sacramentum: painting blasphemy, Modern language notes 109 (1994)
- A perverse history of the human heart, Cambridge, Massachusetts: Harvard University Press, 1997
- La grande conversion numérique, suivi de Rêveries d’un promeneur numérique, Paris: Seuil, 2008. Translated as Digital cultures, 2011. Cambridge, Massachusetts: Harvard University Press, 2011.
- Earthly paradise: myths and philosophies, Cambridge, Massachusetts: Harvard University Press, 2009. Translated by Jane Marie Todd.
- Solitude de l'incomparable, Paris: Seuil, 2009.
- Augustine and Spinoza, Cambridge, Massachusetts: Harvard University Press, 2010.
- Pour un humanisme numérique, Paris: Seuil, 2011.
