= Janet Gezari =

Janet Gezari (born January 27, 1945, in Newark, New Jersey) is a literary critic and scholar and the Lucretia L. Allyn Professor English at Connecticut College. Her areas of specialization include Charlotte and Emily Brontë, Nabokov, Victorian poetry and novels, contemporary fiction, and Bob Dylan. She was a Berlin Prize Fellow at the American Academy in Berlin in 2010.

== Life ==
Gezari graduated from Cornell University summa cum laude in 1966. She received a Woodrow Wilson Fellowship and attended Yale University, where she received an M. Phil. (1968) and a Ph.D. (1971).

== Works ==
- The Annotated Wuthering Heights, edited with introduction and notes by Janet Gezari, Belknap Press (Harvard), 2014.
- Last Things: Emily Brontë's Poems. Oxford University Press. 2007. ISBN 978-0-19-929818-1.,
- Shirley, re-edited with a new introduction, bibliography, and additional notes, Oxford University Press, 2007.
- Emily Jane Brontë: The Complete Poems, ed. by Janet Gezari, Penguin Press, 1992.
- Charlotte Brontë and Defensive Conduct: The Author and the Body at Risk, University of Pennsylvania Press, 1992, ISBN 978-0-8122-3162-5
