= Inga Markovits =

American lawyer

Inga Markovits (born 1937 in Germany) is an American lawyer, and The Friends of Joe Jamail Regents Chair, at the University of Texas. She is the recipient of the 2012 Ellen Maria Gorrisen Berlin Prize and is a Fellow at the American Academy in Berlin.

== Works ==
- Imperfect Justice: An East-West German Diary, Oxford University Press, 1995, ISBN 978-0-19-825814-8; Clarendon Press, 1995, ISBN 978-0-19-825814-8
- Justice in Lüritz: experiencing socialist law in East Germany. Princeton University Press. 2010. ISBN 978-0-691-14347-7.
- "Selective Memory: How the Law Affects What We Remember and Forget About the Past. The Case of East Germany", 35 Law & Society Review 513, 2002
- "Justice in Lüritz", 50 American Journal of Comparative Law 819, 2002
