= Jason Pine =

American anthropologist

- Occupations: Writer, anthropologist
- Employer(s): Purchase College, SUNY
- Known for: The Art of Making Do in Naples; The Alchemy of Meth

Jason Pine is an American writer and anthropologist. He is Professor of Anthropology and Media Studies. at Purchase College, State University of New York. He received his Ph.D. in Anthropology from the University of Texas at Austin. He was a Fellow at the American Academy in Berlin for Fall 2011

== Academic work and publications ==
Pine’s first book, The Art of Making Do in Naples is a study of the contact zones between ordinary people "making do" in neomelodic music scene and organized crime networks known as the camorra, was translated into Italian as Napoli Sotto Traccia: Musica Neomelodica e Marginalità Sociale and received the 2015 Premio Sila (Sguardo da Lontano).

Pine's second book,The Alchemy of Meth elaborates, in literary nonfiction form, ideas on self-enhancement and extractive capitalism proposed in his essays, "Economy of Speed: The New Narco-Capitalism", "Embodied Capitalism and the Meth Body", and "Last Chance Incorporated".

Pine narrated the audiobook version of the book for Blackstone Publishing in 2020. The book received the 2020 Victor Turner Prize for Ethnographic Writing, Honorable Mention and the 2020 Gregory Bateson Book Prize, Honorable Mention

== Research and reception ==
The Art of Making Do in Naples has been widely reviewed and cited across disciplines including anthropology, media studies, criminology, urban studies, Italian studies, and ethnomusicology. Scholars have praised the book's "graceful, engaging prose" and described it as a "sophisticated theorization of sound and space in marginal economies."

Reviews highlight its blending of theory and narrative, and its analysis of neomelodica music as both aesthetic and infrastructural—intertwined with informality, affect, and organized crime.

The book has been referenced in discussions of ethnographic montage, sound and sovereignty, media infrastructures, cultures of criminality, and aesthetics of governance.

It is frequently cited in scholarship on Naples, ethnographic aesthetics, and Italian sound cultures.

The Alchemy of Meth has been cited as a contribution to anthropology, science and technology studies, criminology, medical humanities, and experimental nonfiction. It investigates rural methamphetamine production in Missouri as a form of late-industrial alchemy and precarious toxic craft. It has been described as "a deeply textured account of embodied toxicity and labor."

Pine’s literary technique has been characterized as "ethnographic writing that disturbs the senses" and a "methodological experiment in contaminated storytelling," noted for its "dissolved narration" whose queerness resists "tidy categorization."

== Public engagement ==
Pine's research has been featured in public radio, interviews, and cultural criticism, including:

- To the Best of Our Knowledge, Wisconsin Public Radio (2020):
- Public Intellectual with Jessa Crispin (2020):
- This is Hell! with Chuck Mertz (2019)

His work has also appeared in CityLab, The New Republic, GQ España, 032c, Atlas Obscura, and American Scholar.
