= Leonard Barkan =

American academic

Leonard Barkan (born October 6, 1944) is the Class of 1943 University Professor of Comparative Literature at Princeton University. He won Berlin Prize, Ellen Maria Gorrissen Fellow in Fall 2009. He won the 2001 Harry Levin Prize. Barkan shared the PEN/Architectural Digest Award for Literary Writing on the Visual Arts for Unearthing the Past with Deborah Silverman in 2001.

== Life ==
Barkan taught at the University of California, San Diego, Northwestern University, University of Michigan, and New York University. He was visiting scholar at the Free University of Berlin. He is a Fellow of the New York Institute for the Humanities. He earned degrees from Swarthmore College (BA), Harvard University (MA), and Yale University (PhD).

Barkan was elected as a member of the American Academy of Arts and Sciences in 1994, and a member of the American Philosophical Society in 2005.

== Works ==
- The Gods Made Flesh: Metamorphosis and the Pursuit of Paganism, Yale University Press, 1986, ISBN 978-0-300-03561-2
- Leonard Barkan, ed. (1987). Renaissance Plays: New Readings and Rereadings. Northwestern University Press. ISBN 978-0-8101-0677-2.
- Transuming Passion: Ganymede and the Erotics of Humanism. Stanford University Press. 1991. ISBN 978-0-8047-1851-6.
- Unearthing the Past: Archaeology and Aesthetics in the Making of Renaissance Culture. Yale University Press. 2001. ISBN 978-0-300-08911-0.
- Satyr Square: A Year, a Life in Rome, Northwestern University Press, 2008, ISBN 978-0-8101-2494-3
- Michelangelo: a life on paper, Princeton University Press, 2010, ISBN 978-0-691-14766-6
- Mute Poetry, Speaking Pictures, Princeton University Press, 2012, ISBN 9780691141831
- The Hungry Eye: Eating, Drinking, and European Culture from Rome to the Renaissance, Princeton University Press, 2021, ISBN 9780691211466
- Berlin for Jews: A Twenty-First-Century Companion, University of Chicago Press, 2016, ISBN 9780226010663
- Reading Shakespeare Reading Me, Fordham University Press, 2022, ISBN 9780823299201 doi:10.2307/j.ctv2c02bm4 JSTOR j.ctv2c02bm4
