= New York Institute for the Humanities =

US academic institute

The New York Institute for the Humanities (NYIH) is an academic organization founded by Richard Sennett in 1976 to promote the exchange of ideas between academics, writers, and the general public. The NYIH regularly holds seminars open to the public, as well as meetings for its approximately 250 Fellows. Previously affiliated with the New York University, in 2021, the institute announced its partnership with the New York Public Library.

== About ==
At its founding, the New York Institute for the Humanities was at the forefront of exploring how scholars and writers could come together around issues of common and broad interest. Since that time, the institute has expanded on the original inspiration of its celebrated founders, which included Susan Sontag and Joseph Brodsky, to dedicate itself to examining the status and role of the humanities in the public sphere. The institute comprises nearly 250 distinguished scholars and writers—journalists of ideas, critics, novelists, biographers, memoirists, poets, and translators—in addition to noted editors, publishers, and literary agents. Elected to membership in the NYIH by their peers, fellows hold a lifetime appointment.

During the academic term, NYIH fellows gather for a semiweekly luncheon-seminar organized around a presentation or panel discussion, frequently featuring the work of a member of the institute. Drawing on the interests and intellectual creativity of its fellows, these Friday Fellows Luncheons have become justly celebrated for their contribution to New York's intellectual culture. In 2020–21, when the institute met remotely, some twenty virtual luncheons were held, including a roundtable discussion by writers Ta-Nehisi Coates, Ava Chin, Ben Lerner, Rowan Ricardo Phillips, and Meghan O’Rourke, talks by Alex Ross, Ian Buruma, Adam Tooze, Hermione Lee, and Louis Menand, and conversations on the state of publishing (with Mitzi Angel, Lisa Lucas, Zoë Pagnamenta, and John Freeman) and the art economy after the pandemic (Jason Farago).

== History ==
In the summer of 1976, New York University sociologist Richard Sennett chaired a conference on the Humanities and Social Thought in Bellagio, Italy, in which the idea for a New York–based institute to foster intellectual discourse and cross-disciplinary communication was explored. In December of that year, NYU and Sennett's Center for Humanistic Studies cosponsored the conference “The Future of the Intellectual Community in New York.” The ideas that arose from the conference provided the structure for the New York Institute for the Humanities, which was established in 1977 at NYU by an act of the university's board of trustees.

From the time of the institute's inception, the fellowship program was at the core of the New York Institute for the Humanities, embodying its mission to support the work of individual scholars and intellectuals in an environment that encouraged interaction. About half of the early fellows were academics from New York-area universities, while the rest were artists, writers, journalists, and public officials. In the early years, fellows generally met once or twice a month for informal seminars. As the institute grew, a more defined program evolved in which fellows formed interdisciplinary seminars around topics of interest and participated in weekly lunches. Under the directorship of Sennett, and later Aryeh Neier, Edmund White, Jerome Bruner, and A. Richard Turner, Tony Judt, and Leonard Barkan, the institute's Friday Fellows Luncheon series established itself as a significant weekly event.

From its beginnings, the institute has also hosted public lecture series and conferences. In the early years of its existence, the James Lecture Series brought primarily European intellectuals to the institute. The Gallatin Lecture Series was created shortly thereafter to provide a diverse public audience for American humanists. Such literary and intellectual figures as Michel Foucault, Italo Calvino, Czeslaw Milosz, Jorge Luis Borges, and Roland Barthes presented lectures at the institute and participated in seminars. In 1981 the Institute launched a Humanities Exchange Program for writers exiled from Latin American and Eastern European regimes.

In 2001, new director Lawrence Weschler significantly expanded the Institute's public mission, engineering a popular and imaginative series of lectures, panels, readings, and events on topics ranging from the intellectual response to 9/11 to the experience of solitary confinement. The public offerings were topically diverse: panels considered the legacy of film criticism and the Iraq War, the visionary theories of David Hockney and the rise of comics and graphic novels. Under Weschler's directorship, the fellowship also underwent considerable expansion, growing to include approximately 250 fellows from a variety of fields.

Since 2013, when Eric Banks succeeded Weschler as director, the institute has continued to combine the intimacy of the weekly Fellows Luncheon and the commitment to broadly conceived public events of interest to a number of constituencies, including a two-day conference in 2016 on the intellectual and cultural roots of Black Lives Matter and an evening of performance and panels on the legacy of Free Jazz pioneer Cecil Taylor. A partnership with Princeton University Press established a semi-annual lecture series that revisited the ambitions of the original Gallatin and James lectures. In 2018, the institute launched an additional outreach with the development of a podcast series, in collaboration with the Arthur L. Carter Journalism Institute at NYU, comprising original conversations among fellows and archival presentations culled from the past four decades of NYIH lectures and discussions.

In 2021, the institute announced its partnership with the NYPL, which will provide the NYIH with an expanded set of opportunities for public programming and a new home for the institute's weekly Fellows Luncheon-Seminars.

== Directors ==
1977–78: – Richard Sennett

1978–79: – Richard Sennett and Thomas Bender

1979–80: – Loren Baritz

1980–81: – Aryeh Neier

1981–83: – Edmund White

1983–84: – Edmund White and Richard Sennett

1984–85: – Jerome Bruner

1986–87: – William R. Taylor and A. Richard Turner

1987–92: – A. Richard Turner

1993–96: – Tony Judt

1996–97: – A. Richard Turner and Anne Hollander

1997–2001: – Leonard Barkan

2001–2013: – Lawrence Weschler

2013–present: – Eric Banks
