= Juliet Koss =

American art historian

- Awards: Berlin Prize (2009)

Academic background
- Education: Columbia University (BA); Massachusetts Institute of Technology (PhD)

Academic work
- Discipline: Art history
- Institutions: Scripps College

Juliet Koss is an American art historian. She is the Gabrielle Jungels-Winkler Chair in the History of Architecture and Art at Scripps College.

== Biography ==
Koss received her B.A. from Columbia University in art history and Ph.D. from Massachusetts Institute of Technology in the history and theory of art and architecture. Her research has focused on 19th and 20th century European art with a focus on German and Soviet modernism.

Koss received a Berlin Prize in 2009 to work on her project "The USSR in Construction" that explored the symbolic status of construction during the founding years of the Soviet Union, analyzing works of such figures as Mikhail Bakhtin, Vladimir Mayakovsky, and Kasimir Malevich. She was also a fellow at the Clark Art Institute in 2016. She held the Rudolf Arnheim Visiting Professorship at Humboldt University of Berlin in 2011 and has been a visiting scholar at Harriman Institute at Columbia University.
