= Avery Gordon =

American academic and writer

Avery Gordon is a professor of Sociology, University of California, Santa Barbara, archivist and author of sociological theory and imagination.

== Early life ==
Gordon grew up in Florida, then attended the Georgetown School of Foreign Service. She earned a doctorate from Boston College.

== Career ==
Gordon is a professor of Sociology, University of California, Santa Barbara, archivist and author of sociological theory and imagination. She has also been a visiting Faculty Fellow in the Centre for Research Architecture at Goldsmiths College University of London (2008–2013) and visiting professor at Birkbeck School of Law University of London. In 2012, she was the Anna Maria Kellen Fellow at the American Academy in Berlin. Her writings have been featured in South Atlantic Quarterly, Race & Class, PMLA, and other collections. Gordon's work centers on radical thought and practice, the utopian, haunting and forms of dispossession.

Gordon co-hosts "No Alibis" with Elizabeth Robinson and Marisela Marquez on KCSB 91.9 FM Santa Barbara; a weekly radio program with discussions and interviews about domestic and international affairs.

== Bibliography ==
- The Hawthorn Archive: Letters from the Utopian Margins (2017, Fordham University Press)
- Avery F. Gordon: Notes for the Workhouse: 100 Notes, 100 Thoughts: Documenta Series 041 (2012, Hatje Cantz Publishers)
- Keeping Good Time: Reflections on Knowledge, Power and People (2004, Routledge)
- Ghostly Matters: Haunting and the Sociological Imagination (1997, University of Minnesota Press)
