= Daniel Hobbins =

American historian

Daniel Hobbins is a professor of history at the University of Notre Dame and an American historian specializing in medieval France. He is the recipient of the Nina Maria Gorrissen Prize and Fellow at the American Academy in Berlin for Fall 2011.

== Life ==
Hobbins' best-known work is The Trial of Joan of Arc, which includes the first new translation of the transcripts of Joan of Arc's trial for fifty years. He gave guest lectures on Joan of Arc at Bowling Green State University and Ohio Northern University in October 2007.

He has also written in The American Historical Review on Jean Gerson.

== See also ==
- Joan of Arc bibliography
