= Elizabeth Sears =

Scholar of European medieval art

- Born: 1952 (age 73–74)

Academic background
- Education: Duke University and Yale University

Academic work
- Discipline: Art history
- Sub-discipline: Medieval period
- Institutions: University of Michigan

Elizabeth Langsford Sears (born 1952) is Professor Emerita, George H. Forsyth Jr. Collegiate History of Art at the University of Michigan. She is known for the study of European medieval art and the historiography of art.

== Education ==
Sears attended Duke University, earning a bachelor's degree in 1974. She earned her master's degree and Ph.D. from Yale University in 1982, writing on "the ages of man" under professor Walter Cahn.

== Career ==
Sears is the Professor Emerita, George H. Forsyth Jr. Collegiate History of Art at University of Michigan. She also taught at the Universität Hamburg and Princeton University.

=== Selected books ===
- Verzetteln als Methode: Der humanistische Ikonologe William S. Heckscher (2008), co-authored with Charlotte Schoell-Glass, Hamburger Forschungen zur Kunstgeschichte, Akademie Verlag.
- With Edgar Wind, The Religious Symbolism of Michelangelo: The Sistine Ceiling (2000), editor, Oxford University Press.
- The Ages of Man: Medieval Interpretations of the Life Cycle (1986), Princeton University Press. (winner of the John Nicholas Brown Prize of the Medieval Academy of America in 1990)

== Awards and honors ==
Sears is the recipient of numerous awards including a Paul Mellon Centre Fellowship at the British School at Rome in 2004, a Guggenheim Fellowship in 2010, and the Andrew W. Mellon Foundation Fellowship, Dorothy and Lewis B. Cullman Center for Scholars and Writers, New York Public Library, 2019-2020. Also in 2010 Sears was the Paul Mellon Senior Fellow at the Center for Advanced Study in the Visual Arts (CASVA) of the National Gallery of Art in Washington, D.C.
