= Christian Joerges =

German legal scholar

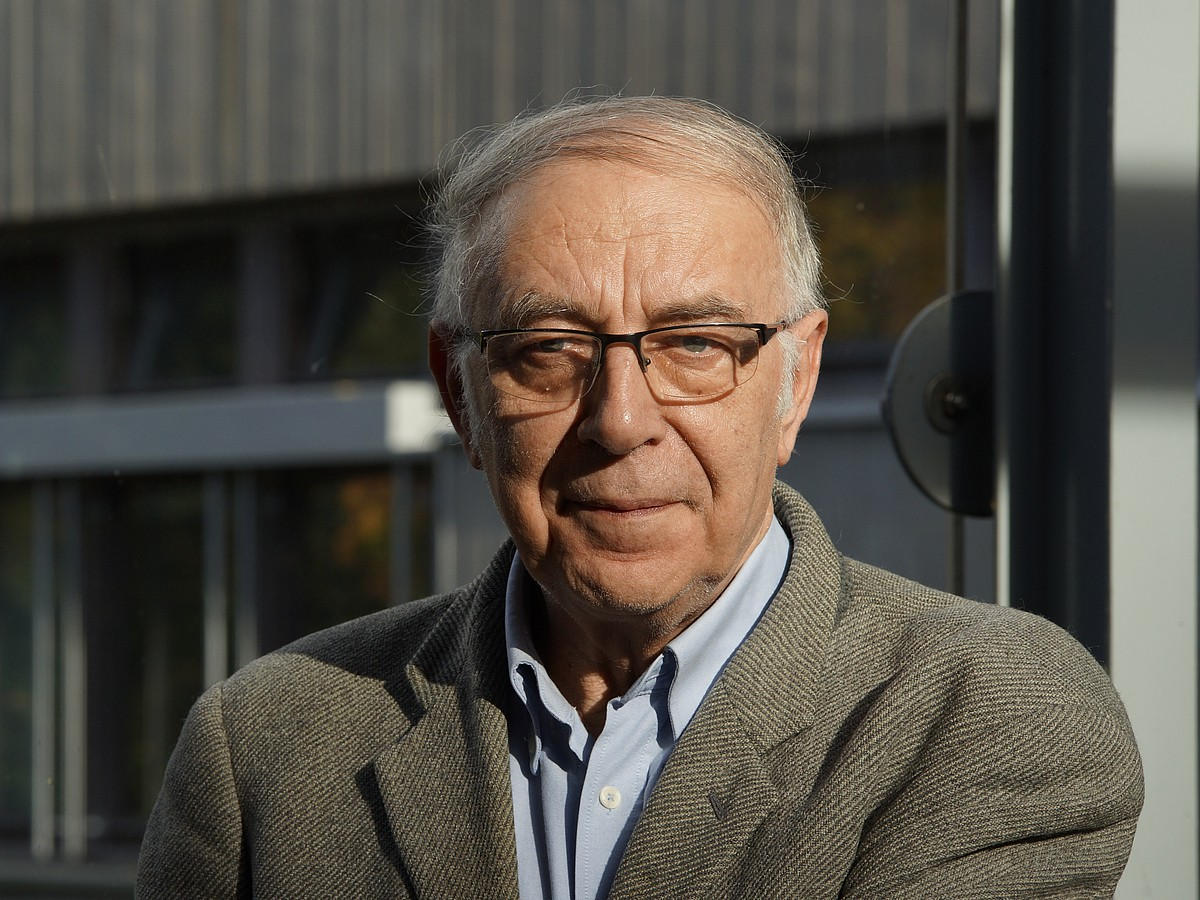
- Born: 1943; Weißenfels, Germany
- Died: 18 July 2025 (aged 81)

Academic background
- Education: Goethe University Frankfurt; University of Montpellier

Academic work
- Main interests: German Private Law; Private International Law (Conflict of Laws) and International Economic Law

Christian Joerges (27 September 1943 – 18 July 2025) was a German legal scholar and professor emeritus of Law and Society. He also was the co-director of the Centre for European Law and Politics at the University of Bremen.

== Background ==
Christian Joerges studied law from 1962 to 1966 at the universities of Frankfurt am Main and Montpellier and passed the first state examination. He then spent a year as a research fellow at the Institute for International and Foreign Commercial Law in Washington, D.C. In 1970, he earned his doctorate from the University of Frankfurt. After passing the assessor examination in 1972, Joerges joined the University of Frankfurt as a lecturer in 1973. Two years later, he was appointed a professor at the newly established University of Bremen. He served as director of the Center for European Legal Policy (ZERP) at the University of Bremen from 1982 to 1987 and again from 1994 to 1998.

Joerges has had a varied academic career, including positions at universities and academic institutions in Europe, the United States, and Canada. He rejoined the Faculty of Law at the University of Bremen in 2007 and has been researching European and transnational economic law at the Hertie School of Governance, where he was senior professor for Law and Society between 2013 and 2018.

In 2009, Joerges was awarded an honorary doctorate from the University of Fribourg.

== Publications ==
Since 1971 Joerges has authored and co-authored close to 500 works including on German private law, private international law, legal theory, economic sociology and political economy.

== Selected Publications ==
- Bereicherungsrecht als Wirtschaftsrecht. Eine Untersuchung zur Entwicklung von Leistungs- und Eingriffskondiktion. Otto Schmidt, Köln, 1977
- Verbraucherschutz als Rechtsproblem: eine Untersuchung zum Stand der Theorie und zu den Entwicklungsperspektiven des Verbraucherrec, 1981
- Zum Funktionswandel des Kollisionsrechts. Die "Governmental Interest Analysis" und die "Krise des Internationalen Privatrechts", Berlin, 1971
- Conflict and Transformation. Essays on European Law and Policy. Essays on European Law and Policy, Oxford: Hart Publishing 2022
- The Challenges of Europeanization in the Realm of Private Law: A Plea for a New Legal Discipline", Duke Journal of Comparative and International Law 24, 2004
- Relational Contracts Law in a Comparative Perspective: Tensions Between Contract and Antitrust Law Principles, 1985
- Compliance research in legal perspectives", in Michael Zürn and Christian Joerges (eds.), Law and Governance in Postnational Europe. Compliance Beyond the Nation-State, Cambridge, 2005
- The European Crisis and the Transformation of Transnational Governance. Authoritarian Managerialism Versus Democratic Governance : by Christian Joerges and Carola Glinski (eds), 2014
- "Brother, can you paradigm"?, Review Essay, Kaarlo Tuori and Klaus Tuori. The Eurozone Crisis. A Constitutional Analysis. Cambridge: Cambridge University Press, 2014
- 'In the Glass Darkly': Legacies of Nazi and Fascist Law in Europe, Darker Legacies of Law in Europe: The Shadow of National Socialism and Fascism over Europe and Its Legal Traditions by Christian Joerges, Navraj Singh

== Blog Posts ==
- Justice within and between Polities, Debate about Europe's Justice Deficit, VerfBlog Mi. 10. Jun. 2015;
- With Florian Rödl, EU-Kommissionspräsident: Wen und was wollten wir eigentlich wählen? (EU Commission President: Who and what did we actually vote for?) VerfBlog Do. 3. Jul. 2014;
- Democratisation of Euro-Governance is the Solution!"—But what was the Problem?, Eutopia Law (Oct. 12, 2012),
- Where the Law Ends, Debate about The Eurozone Crisis, Sa. 12. Apr. 2014;
- Would the election of a Member of the European Parliament as President of the Commission make democratic sense? Mi. 4. Jul. 2012;

== Honors ==
- 1964-1966 Student Scholarship from the Bischöfliche Studienstiftung Cusanuswerk.
- 1970 "Walter-Kolb-Gedächtnispreis" from the City of Frankfurt awarded by jury "for a particularly good academic dissertation"
- 1985-86 Fellow at the Netherlands Institute for Advanced Study in the Humanities and Social Sciences (NIAS), Wassenaar, NL
- 1992-1993 Fellow at the Berlin Institute for Advanced Study
- 2009 Honorary Doctorate, University Freiburg i.Ue., Switzerland.
- Legal "experts from Europe and the US" joined to honor Joerges during a symposium, "The Political in the Economy and its Law" at Hertie School of Governance on May 12, 2018.
- Joerges delivered the second annual Herbert L. Bernstein Memorial Lecture in International and Comparative Law "Herbert L. Bernstein Memorial Lecture" at Duke University School of Law in 2003.
- On 5 December 2018, at the University of Amsterdam's law school, an "interdisciplinary group of scholars" discussed Christian Joerges's work during a Symposium: Law, Conflict and Transformation.
