= Judith Wechsler =

American art historian and filmmaker

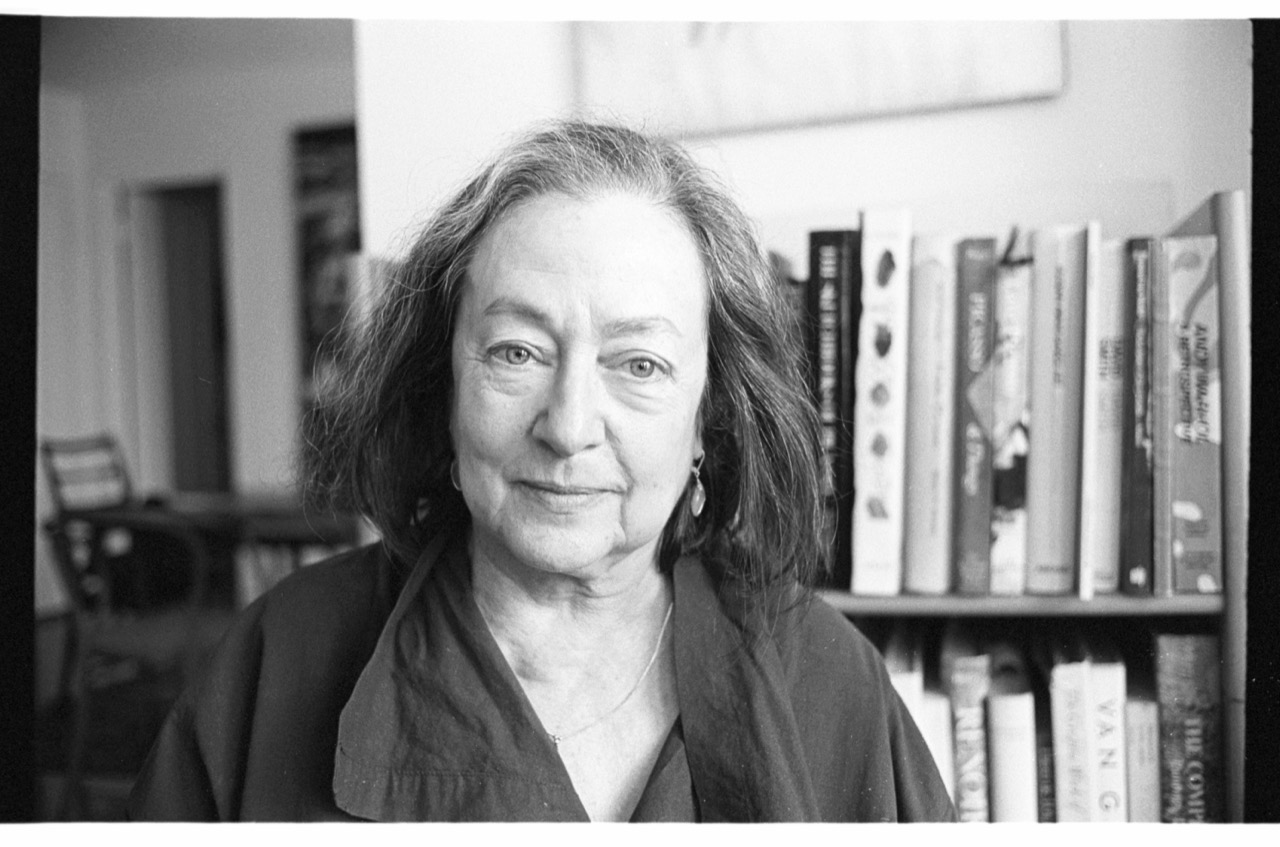
- Photo by Melissa Shook
- Born: December 28, 1940 (age 85); Chicago, Illinois

Academic work
- Discipline: Art historian Documentary filmmaker

Judith Wechsler (née Glatzer; born December 28, 1940) is an American art historian and filmmaker. She is the National Endowment for the Humanities Professor Emerita at Tufts University, specializing in nineteenth-century French painting, drawing, and caricature. Wechsler has engaged in interdisciplinary studies: the intersection of art and theater, art and science, art and film, and is a documentary filmmaker on art and ideas. She has also taught at MIT and Harvard.

== Early life and education ==
Wechsler was born in Chicago. Her parents were Nahum Norbert Glatzer, a noted Judaic scholar, and Anne Stiebel (Glatzer), a remedial reading teacher. They immigrated to the U.S. in 1938 from Germany via Palestine and London. Wechsler attended Crown Heights Yeshivah in Brooklyn, New York and public schools in Watertown, Massachusetts. She earned her B.A. from Brandeis University in Judaic Studies, her M.A. in art history from Columbia University, and her Ph.D. in art history at the University of California at Los Angeles, writing her thesis on "Major Trends in Cézanne Interpretations," which she later published as The Interpretation of Cézanne in 1981.

== Academic career ==
Wechsler taught art history at the Massachusetts Institute of Technology for seven years in the Department of Architecture and for two years as a fellow in the Center for Advanced Visual Studies. She taught at Rhode Island School of Design for nine years as associate professor and professor of art history then served for 21 years as the National Endowment for the Humanities Professor in Art History at Tufts University and as department chair (1990–1995). She was visiting professor at Harvard University, l'École normale supérieure in Paris, University of Paris, and Hebrew University of Jerusalem.

== Personal life ==
Wechsler was married twice, first to Richard Wechsler, a Classics student who became a film producer from 1963 to 1967, then to Benson Rowell Snyder, M.D., a psychiatrist and professor at MIT, from 1976 until his death in 2012. Wechsler has one daughter, Johanna Wechsler, with Richard Wechsler.

Wechsler met Charles Eames when he was on the visiting committee for MIT's Architecture department, and she was an assistant professor. In the 2011 documentary, "Eames: The Architect & The Painter," Wechsler describes the many letters Eames wrote to her, and his desire for them to get married, have a child, close the Eames office in Venice, which he found "burdensome," and open an office together in New York. Wechsler said in the documentary, "We had a very profound love for each other." However, she did not pursue their romantic relationship further, citing unfairness to Ray Eames, Charles's wife, whom Wechsler considered a friend.

== Selected works ==
=== BOOKS ===
- Cézanne in Perspective (ed.). Prentice-Hall, 1975.
- On Aesthetics in Science (ed.). MIT Press, 1978.
- The Interpretation of Cézanne. UMI Research Press, 1981.
- A Human Comedy: Physiognomy and Caricature in 19th Century Paris. University of Chicago Press, 1982.
- Art Journal: The Issue of Caricature. College Art Association of America, 1984.
- The Memoirs of Nahum Glatzer (with Michael Fishbane). HUC Press, 1998.
- Le Cabinet des Dessins, Daumier. Flammarion, 1999.
- Chez Moi (with Ricardo Bloch). Blurb Books, 2017.
- My Life in Letters. Blurb Books, 2020.
- Notes from My Life. Blurb Books, 2023.

=== FILMS ===
- Isaiah Berlin: Philosopher of Liberty, 72 min, 2018
- Svetlana Boym: Exile and Imagination, 60 min, 2017
- Aby Warburg, Metamorphosis and Memory. 60 min, 2016
- The Passages of Walter Benjamin, 55 min, 2014
- Nahum Glatzer and the German Jewish Tradition, 60 min, 2011
- Le Dessein de Nymphéas, [English version—Monet’s Waterlillies: Design and Intention] 45 min, 2007
- Rachel de la Comédie-Française, with La Comédie-Française, 52 min, 2003
- Honoré Daumier: Il faut être de son temps, 52 min. [English version: Honoré Daumier, One must be of one’s time]
- Dessiner, la main qui pense, 53 min. Louvre, Paris. 1996. [English version: Drawing, the thinking hand]
- Harry Callahan, 30 min, 1992
- Aaron Siskind: Making Pictures, 30 min, 1991
- Jasper Johns: Take an Object (with Hans Namuth), 30 min, 1990
- The Painter’s World: Changing Constants of Art from the Renaissance to the Present

Six 30-minute films broadcast by WGBH-TV, Boston and Channel 4, London, 1984-90

- Édouard Manet: Painter of Modern Life, 30 min, Metropolitan Museum of Art, NY, 1982
- Pissarro: At the Heart of Impressionism, 20 min, Museum of Fine Arts, Boston, 1981
- Cézanne: The Late Work, Co-directed with Charles Eames, 10 min, 1978
- Daumier, Paris and The Spectator, Co-directed with Charles Eames, 18 min, 1977

== Awards ==
- Chevalier dans l’Ordre des Arts et des Lettres, 2007
- Fellow, American Academy in Berlin, 2011
- Senior fellow, The Van Leer Jerusalem Institute, 2010
- Bogliasco Foundation Fellowship, 2011
- Miller Award for Outstanding Female Film Director, 2012
- National Endowment for the Humanities awards (6)
- National Endowment for the Arts awards (2)
