= Joel F. Harrington =

American historian

Joel Francis Harrington (born August 25, 1959) is an American historian of pre-modern Germany. He is currently Centennial Professor of History at Vanderbilt University. He has published books for both scholarly and general audiences, and his work has been translated into thirteen foreign languages.

== Education ==
Harrington was born in Toledo, Ohio, and attended Catholic elementary and secondary schools there. He graduated from the University of Notre Dame in 1981 with a B.A. in English and History. After studying at universities in France and Germany, Harrington was awarded a Ph.D. in History from the University of Michigan, Ann Arbor in 1989.

== Career and Scholarship ==
Since 1989, Harrington has taught at Vanderbilt University, where he is now Centennial Professor of History. His research has focused on pre-1700 Germany, particularly on social, legal, and religious topics. He has been especially interested in finding a balanced perspective on short-term micro-historical individual experiences and long-term macro-historical social structures.

Harrington's most recent monograph, Dangerous Mystic, provides a focused study of the life and teachings of the famous medieval friar Meister Eckhart. His third monograph, The Faithful Executioner, adopted a similar approach for the life and times of a sixteenth-century German executioner. Following the release of The Faithful Executioner, Harrington edited and translated The Executioner's Journal: Meister Frantz Schmidt of the Imperial City. Harrington has also published The Unwanted Child (2009) and Reordering Marriage and Society in Reformation Germany (1995). He worked as an editor for A Cloud of Witnesses: Readings in the History of Western Christianity (2001) and co-edited Names and Naming in Early Modern Germany with Marjorie Elizabeth Plummer in 2019.

Harrington was a visiting fellow at Institut für Geschichte der Medizin (Universität Erlangen-Nürnberg), Herzog August Bibliothek (Wolfenbüttel), Clare College (Cambridge University) and at the American Academy in Berlin.

== Personal life ==
Harrington lives in Nashville, Tennessee with his wife, Beth Monin Harrington, and their two children.

== Award and honors ==
- American Academy of Arts and Letters Literature Award (2020)
- Guggenheim Fellowship (2018)
- Vanderbilt Chancellor's Research Award (2014)
- Roland H. Bainton Book Prize in History for The Unwanted Child (2010)
- Berlin Prize, American Academy in Berlin (2009)
- National Endowment for the Humanities Fellowship (1999)
- Fulbright-Hays Fellowship (1985)

== Selected bibliography ==
=== Books ===
- Reordering Marriage and Society in Reformation Germany (Cambridge University Press, 1995; paperback: 2005). ISBN 0-521-46483-8.
- (Editor), A Cloud of Witnesses: Readings in the History of Western Christianity (Houghton Mifflin, 2001). ISBN 0-395-96883-6.
- The Unwanted Child: The Fate of Orphans, Foundlings, and Juvenile Criminals in Early Modern Germany (University of Chicago Press, 2009; paperback: 2013). ISBN 978-0-226-31729-8.
- The Faithful Executioner: Life and Death, Honor and Shame in the Turbulent Sixteenth Century (Farrar, Straus & Giroux, 2013; Paperback: 2013). ISBN 978-1-250-04361-0.
- (Editor & Translator), The Executioner’s Journal: Meister Frantz Schmidt of the Imperial City of Nuremberg (University of Virginia Press, 2016). ISBN 978-0-8139-3871-4.
- Dangerous Mystic: Meister Eckhart’s Path to the God Within (Penguin Press, 2018). ISBN 978-1-101-98156-6.
- (Co-editor with Marjorie Elizabeth Plummer), Names and Naming in Early Modern Germany (Berghahn, 2019). ISBN 978-1-78920-211-3.
