= Leland de la Durantaye =

American writer and academic

- Born: 1972 (age 53–54)
- Occupations: Critic; translator; writer
- Awards: Berlin Prize

Academic background
- Education: Cornell University

Academic work
- Discipline: Comparative literature
- Institutions: Harvard University

Leland de la Durantaye (born 1972) is a writer, critic, translator and professor of comparative literature. He has taught at the École normale supérieure and Harvard University and is currently Professor of Literature at Claremont McKenna College.

He has been a Fulbright fellow, a Woodrow Wilson fellow, a DAAD fellow, a Mellon fellow, a fellow of the American Academy in Berlin, and a fellow of the Center for Human Values at Princeton University. De la Durantaye is the author of three books and over eighty articles on topics in philosophy, French literature, German literature, Italian literature, anglophone literature and the visual arts.

His translation of Jacques Jouet's Upstaged was a finalist for the PEN Best Translated Book of 2012.

His nonfiction books are Style is Matter: The Moral Art of Vladimir Nabokov (2007), Giorgio Agamben: A Critical Introduction (2009), and Beckett’s Art of Mismaking (2016).

His articles have appeared in The New York Times, The Boston Globe, The Village Voice, The London Review of Books, Bookforum, Artforum, The Believer, and other newspapers and magazines.

He serves on the editorial boards of the Harvard Review and Cabinet.

His first novel, Hannah versus the Tree, was published by McSweeney's in November 2018.

== Works ==
- Style Is Matter: The Moral Art of Vladimir Nabokov. Cornell University Press. 2007. ISBN 978-0-8014-4563-7.
- Giorgio Agamben: A Critical Introduction. Stanford University Press. 2009. ISBN 978-0-8047-6143-7.
- Beckett's Art of Mismaking. Harvard University Press, 2016
- Hannah Versus the Tree. McSweeney's Publishing, 2018, ISBN 9781944211509.

=== Translations ===
- Jacques Jouet (2011). Upstaged. Dalkey Archive. ISBN 978-1-56478-574-9.
- Giorgio Agamben, The Church and Its Reign, Seagull Books
- Giorgio Agamben, The Unspeakable Girl, Seagull Books
