= American Academy in Berlin =

American-German research and cultural institution

Coordinates: 52°25′29″N 13°10′47″E

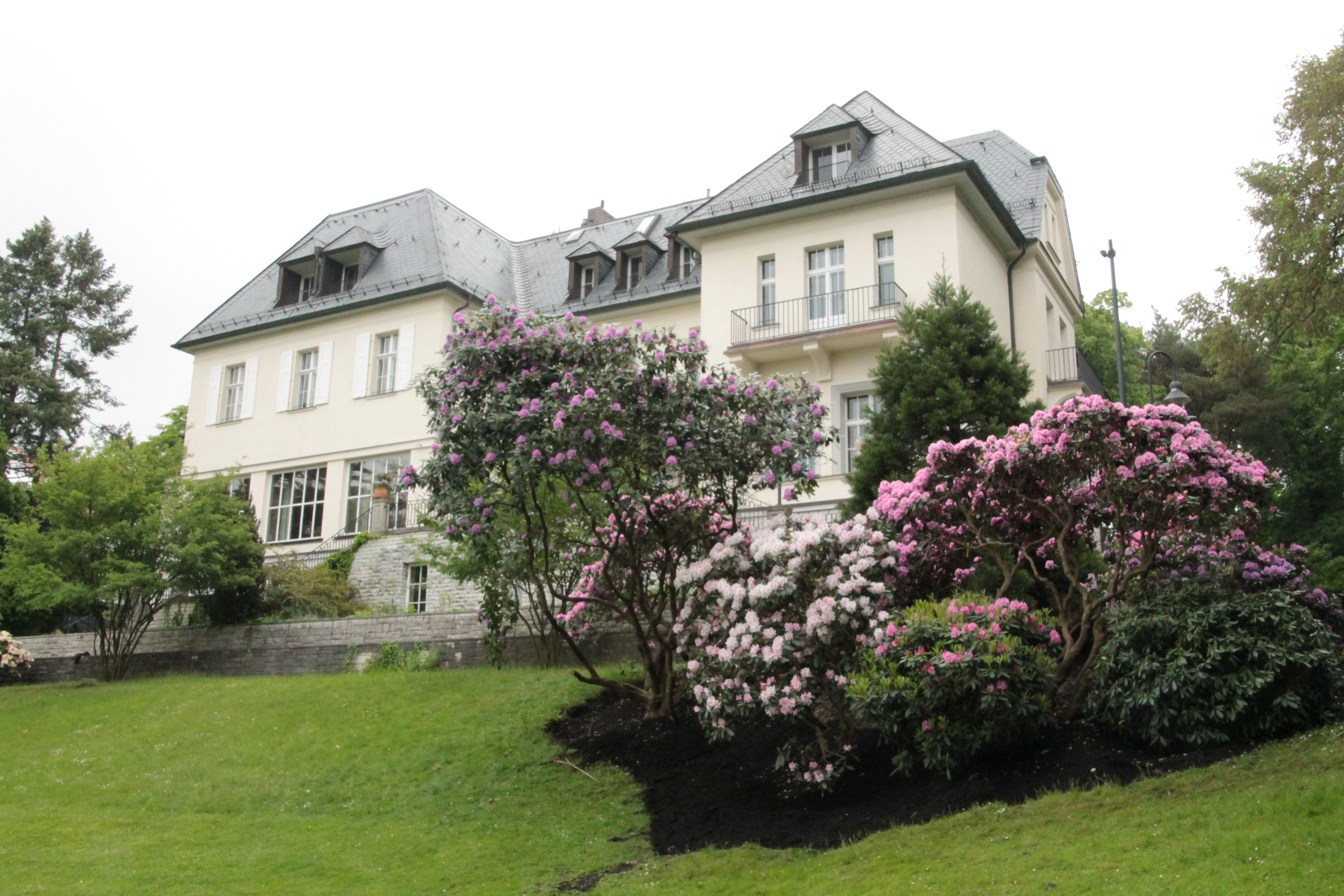
American Academy in Berlin villa, 2013

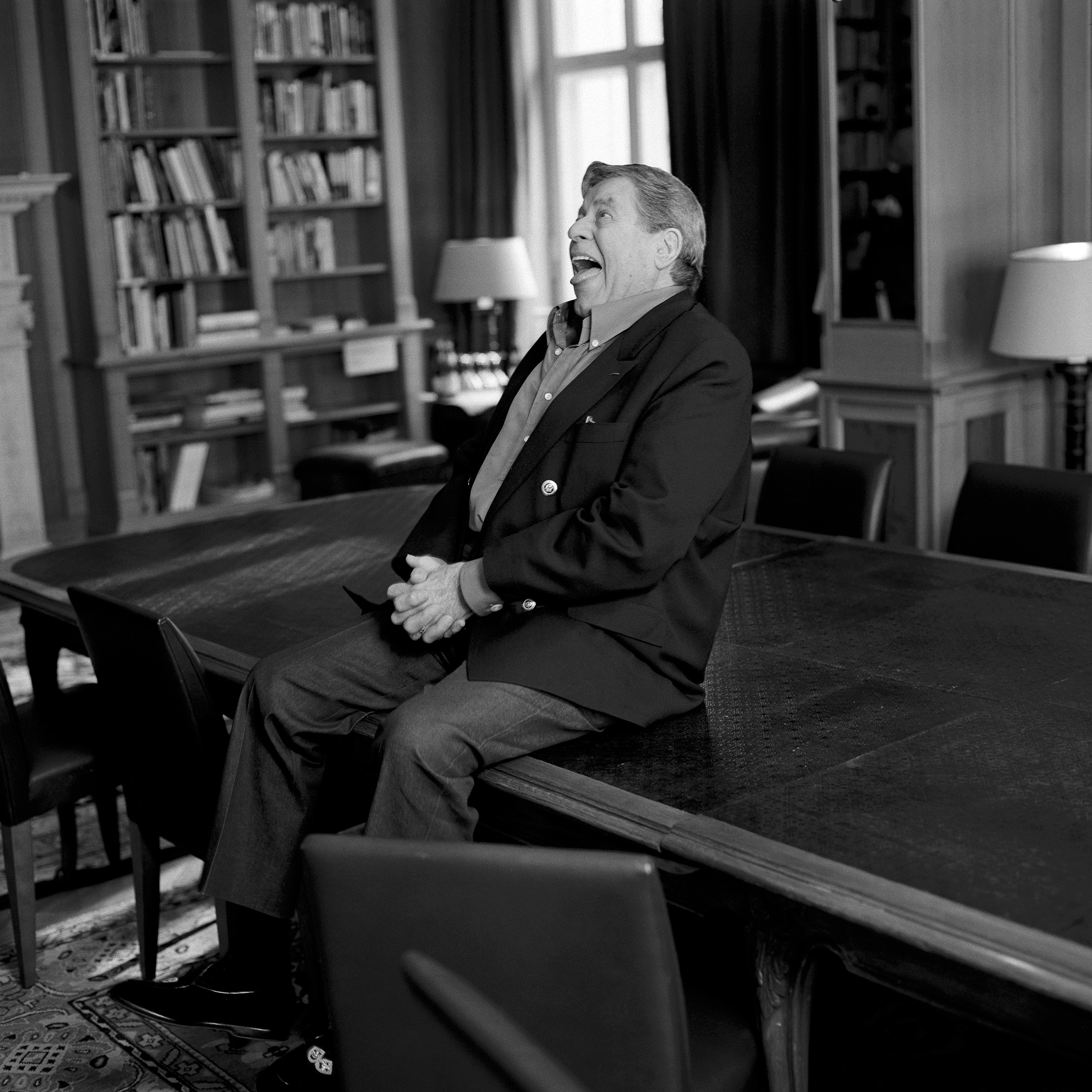
Jerry Lewis photographed by Oliver Mark in the library of the American Academy in Berlin (2006)

The American Academy in Berlin is a private, independent, nonpartisan research and cultural institution in Berlin dedicated to sustaining and enhancing the long-term intellectual, cultural, and political ties between the United States and Germany. Each year, the Academy's independent search committee nominates circa twenty fellows from among hundreds of applicants to pursue semester-long research projects at the Hans Arnhold Center, a historic villa on the shores of Lake Wannsee. Fellows, who come from the humanities, social sciences, public policy, and the arts, share their work with German colleagues and audiences at lectures, readings, discussions, concerts, and film screenings, which form the core of the Academy's programme of nearly 100 public events per year. The American Academy in Berlin has an office in New York City and its board of trustees is composed of several dozen influential leaders from German and American business, finance, culture, and academia.

In addition to its fellowship programme, the Academy fosters dialogue on current issues by hosting Distinguished Visitors—thought-leaders from the United States in public policy, law, business, finance, journalism, the humanities, and the arts. During their visits of a few days to a few weeks, they engage with the public and their professional counterparts in Berlin and throughout Germany on topics ranging from constitutional law and immigration policy to museum practice and art criticism. Since 1998, the American Academy in Berlin has hosted over 600 residential fellows and hundreds of Distinguished Visitors.

The American Academy in Berlin was founded in September 1994 by a group of prominent Americans and Germans, among them Richard Holbrooke, Henry Kissinger, Richard von Weizsäcker, Fritz Stern, and Thomas Farmer. Dubbed in 2008 "the world's most important center for American intellectual life outside the US" by the German weekly magazine Der Spiegel, the American Academy in Berlin is funded entirely by private donations from individuals, corporations, and foundations on both sides of the Atlantic—most prominently the Arnhold-Kellen family, the keystone of the Academy's history and funding.

The Wannsee villa that houses the American Academy in Berlin, designed in 1886 by architect Johannes Otzen, was once the home of chemist Franz Oppenheim and, later, the Dresden-born banker Hans Arnhold and his wife, Ludmilla, and their two daughters, Ellen Maria and Anna-Maria. After the Arnholds were forced to emigrate, in 1937, the house was appropriated and occupied by Walther Funk, the Minister of Economics of the Third Reich and later president of the Reichsbank.

The Arnhold family regained ownership of the home in 1953, and the villa was sold to the Federal Republic of Germany in 1958. During the post-WWII tripartite division of the Berlin, the villa was located in the American Sector. There, it was designated for various uses, including as a home for refugees from communist Eastern Bloc countries and, for the last decades of the Cold War, a U.S. Army recreation center, until the departure of American military forces from reunified Berlin, in 1994.

Following a thorough renovation of the building, made possible by the financial backing of the Arnhold-Kellen family and a number of other supporters, the villa opened as the American Academy in Berlin in 1998.

== Prizes ==
=== Berlin Prize Fellowship ===
The American Academy in Berlin awards the Berlin Prize Fellowship to Americans in the fields of arts, literature, humanities, politics, economics, law, and composition. Usually 12 fellows are in residence at the Hans Arnhold Center for one academic semester. The Berlin Prize includes a monthly stipend, partial board, and residence at the Academy's Hans Arnhold Center. In addition, the organization hosts short-term visiting Americans from a variety of disciplines and professions. Past Distinguished Visitors include US Supreme Court Justices Stephen Breyer and Sonia Sotomayor, economists Paul Krugman and Joseph Stiglitz, journalists and writers including Arthur Miller, Jill Abramson, Masha Gessen, Elizabeth Kolbert, David Frum, Malcolm Gladwell, Frances FitzGerald, Calvin Trillin, Jeffrey Goldberg, Percival Everett, and Colson Whitehead.

=== Henry A. Kissinger Prize ===
Since 2007 the Henry A. Kissinger Prize has been awarded annually to a European or American who has made a lasting contribution to bettering the transatlantic relationship. Previous recipients of the prize are former German chancellor Helmut Schmidt (2007); 41st President of the United States of America George H. W. Bush (2008); former President of the Federal Republic of Germany Richard von Weizsäcker (2009); New York Mayor Michael Bloomberg (2010); former German chancellor Helmut Kohl (2011); former US Secretary of State George P. Shultz (2012); founder of the Munich Security Conference Ewald-Heinrich von Kleist (2013); former US Secretary of State James A. Baker, III (2014); former President of Italy Giorgio Napolitano and former Federal Foreign Minister and Vice Chancellor of Germany Hans-Dietrich Genscher (2015); former US Ambassador to the United Nations Samantha Power (2016); Germany's former Federal Minister of Finance Wolfgang Schäuble (2017); US Senator John McCain (2018), German Chancellor Angela Merkel (2020); former United States Secretary of Defense General James N. Mattis (2021); German Federal President Frank-Walter Steinmeier (2022); former Secretary General of the North Atlantic Treaty Organization Jens Stoltenberg (2023); and High Representative for Foreign Affairs and Security Policy and Vice-President of the European Commission and former Prime Minister of the Republic of Estonia Kaja Kallas, Prime Minister of the Republic of Latvia Evika Siliņa, and former Prime Minister of the Republic of Lithuania Ingrida Šimonytė (2025).

== Publications ==
The American Academy in Berlin's annual magazine, The Berlin Journal, contains a range of essays, fiction, art, and poetry by fellows and Distinguished Visitors.

== Richard C. Holbrooke Forum ==
The Richard C. Holbrooke Forum brings together international scholars, policy experts, and government officials in a series of workshops to discuss some of the most intractable problems in modern diplomacy. Its core themes are: Statecraft and Values; Enduring Crisis of Governance; Dynamics of Transformation; and Securing the Peace: Post-Conflict Coexistence and Reconciliation.

== See also ==
- American Academy in Rome
