= International Commission for the History and Theory of Historiography =

Organization of historians and scholars

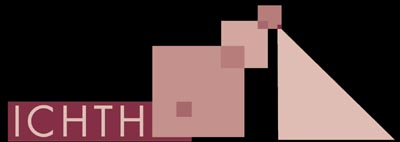
- Abbreviation: ICHTH
- Founded: 1980; 46 years ago (as International Commission for the History of Historiography)
- Purpose: Historiography, philosophy of history
- Region served: Worldwide
- President: Antoon de Baets (2022-2027)
- Vice-President: Olufunke Adeboye
- Website: https://www.ichth.net/

The International Commission for the History and Theory of Historiography (ICHTH) is an international non-profit organization affiliated with the International Committee of Historical Sciences (ICHS). Established in 1980, the Commission is composed of historians, theorists of history and other specialists in related fields, who work together on a global scale to promote research and the exchange of ideas in two core areas: the history of historiography and the philosophy of historiography. Among other activities, it regularly organizes conferences and workshops, promotes publications and awards prizes for books and doctoral theses.

== Background ==
=== History ===
Originally called the International Commission for the History of Historiography, it was founded in 1980 during the 15th International Congress of Historical Sciences in Bucharest. It changed to its present name in 1995, during the 18th International Congress of Historical Sciences in Montreal, to better reflect its two main fields of interest: the history of historiography and the theory of historiography.

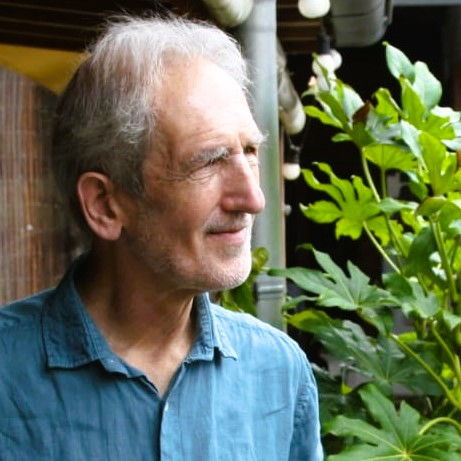
Antoon de Baets, current President of the ICHTH

It is currently headed by Antoon De Baets (2022-2027), prof. em. of History, Ethics and Human Rights at the University of Groningen.

=== Mission ===
The Commission seeks to promote the study of the history and theory of historiography, as well as the philosophy of history, historical methodology and historical culture. It encourages debates and exchanges between different approaches to these subjects, and emphasizes non-discrimination on the basis of nationality, ethnicity, gender, race, religion, political or other opinion, or sexual orientation in its activities or operations. In particular, the Commission seeks to avoid regional and ethnocentric assumptions, in order to reflect the diversity of perspectives in the field. Its work has been described as providing a key institutional platform for various kinds of ‘cross-fertilisation between historical and philosophical perspectives.’

== Activities ==
The Commission coordinates an international network of researchers with the aim of establishing and strengthen partnerships with international and national organizations and bodies that promote discussion of the themes contained in the Commission’s mission. It does so through various activities: organizing regular international conferences and symposia; maintaining partnerships with all journals, blogs, and networks in its core areas; sponsoring the publication of reference works; awarding prizes to significant recent contributions to the field; and maintaining a website providing information on its activities and publications.

=== Conferences ===
Since its foundation, the ICHTH has organized or co-sponsored conferences and workshops around the world. Of particular relevance have been the panels on history and theory of historiography it has organized as part of the International Congress of Historical Sciences, organized by the ICHS. The Commission was present at the ICHS Congresses of Bucharest (1980), Stuttgart (1985), Madrid (1990), Montreal (1995), Oslo (2000), Sydney (2005), Amsterdam (2010), Jinan (2015), and Poznań (2022). It currently prepares its presence at the ICHS Centennial Conference in Leipzig (2026).

=== Journal ===
The journal Storia della Storiografia was established in 1982 as a journal of the ICHTH and published in four languages. Storia was initially edited by Bianca Valota Cavallotti, and subsequently by Edoardo Tortarolo and Guido Abbattista in collaboration with Georg Iggers. The first text published by the journal was “Pour une histoire de l’historiographie” (“For a History of Historiography”), a methodological manifesto written by the Commission’s first President Charles-Olivier Carbonell, which outlined the relevance and potential of the history of historiography as a field of study. Over the decades, the journal has increasingly followed an independent course, sometimes in close collaboration with ICHTH (as is the case since 2022), sometimes at some distance.

The Commission further provides special subscription rates for its members to History and Theory, the Journal of the History of Ideas, the Journal of the Philosophy of History, Rethinking History, and Storia della Storiografia.

=== Reference Works ===
The Commission has sponsored the publication of Great Historians from Antiquity to 1800: An International Dictionary (Greenwood Press, 1989) and Great Historians of the Modern Age: An International Dictionary (Greenwood Press, 1991) edited by Lucian Boia, the Commission’s first secretary-general. Further, many Commission members have contributed to some of the most important collective reference works or book series in the field such as Elements in Historical Theory and Practice (Cambridge University Press, 2022–), Bloomsbury History: Theory and Method (Bloomsbury Publishing, 2021–), The Politics of Historical Thinking (De Gruyter, 2019–), Oxford History of Historical Writing, 5 vol. (Oxford University Press, 2011–2015), and Making Sense of History (Berghahn Books, 2002–).

=== Awards ===
Since 2013, the Commission has instituted several awards to recognize recent works that made a significant contribution to the fields promoted in its mission. These include the prize for best doctoral thesis, best book, and best first book. In 2022, it partnered with the International Network for the Theory of History (INTH) to organize a joint award.

Prize for Best Book
Year	Author	Country	Title
2016	Jouni-Matti Kuukkanen	Finland	Postnarrativist Philosophy of Historiography
2022	Hans Ruin	Sweden	Being with the Dead: Burial, Ancestral Policies and the Roots of Historical Consciousness
2022	Zoltán Boldizsár Simon	Hungary	History in Times of Unprecedented Change: A Theory for the 21st Century
2024	Jörg van Norden	Germany	Verlust der Vergangenheit: Historische Erkenntnis und Materialität zwischen Wiedererkennen und Befremden

Prize for Best First Book
Year	Author	Country	Title
2024	Mariana Imaz-Sheinbaum	Mexico	Historical Narratives: Constructable, Evaluable, Inevitable

Prize for Best Doctoral Thesis
Year	Author	Country	Title
2013	Berber Bevernage	Great Britain	History, Memory, and State-Sponsored Violence: Time and Justice
2018	Ritwik Bhattacharyya	India	Homo Ahistoricus: Disavowal of History in Colonial South Asian Writing

=== Website ===
The Commission has maintained a website since 2007. Its newest version was created in 2022. It includes news from the Commission and its partners, information about its past and future meetings, prizes, history, constitution and board. It also maintains an archive and a database of relevant links. Twice a year, the Commission shares a newsletter with its members.

== Structure ==
=== Constitution ===
The Commission is grounded in a constitution that structures its activities and organization. It consists of 11 articles: the Commission’s definition; its objectives; activities; non-discrimination clause; resources; conditions for membership; membership fees; its organs; conditions for the convening of the general assembly; its board; and the conditions for the modification of itsconstitution; and the conditions for its dissolution. On 22 February 2024, the Board decided that the text for an updated constitution would be put to a vote at the next General Assembly.

=== Board ===
The board of the Commission consists of four executive committee members, two prize coordinators, and seven members. The 2022–2027 board looks as follows:

Executive Committee
Title	Name	Country	University
President	Antoon de Baets	Belgium	University of Groningen
Vice-President	Olufunke Adeboye	Nigeria	University of Lagos
Secretary-General & Program Chair	Marnie Hughes-Warrington	Australia	University of South Australia
Secretary-General & Program Chair	Daniel Woolf	Canada	Queen's University

Prize Coordinators
Name	Country	University
Berber Bevernage	Belgium	University of Ghent
Marek Tamm	Estonia	Tallinn University

Members
Name	Country	University
Dipesh Chakrabarty	India	University of Chicago
Efi Gazi	Greece	University of the Peloponnese
Allan Megill	Canada	University of Virginia
Sanjay Seth	India	University of London
Verónica Tozzi	Argentina	Universidad de Buenos Aires
Xupeng Zhang	China	Chinese Academy of Social Sciences
Ewa Domańska	Poland	Adam Mickiewicz University, Stanford University

=== Past Chairs ===
Term	Name	Country
1980–1990	Charles-Olivier Carbonell	France
1990–1995	Wolfgang Mommsen	Germany
1995–2000	Georg Iggers	United States
2000–2005	Richard Vann	United States
2005–2010	Masayuki Sato	Japan
2010–2015	Antonis Liakos	Greece
2015–2022	Ewa Domańska	Poland
2022–2027	Antoon de Baets	Belgium

=== Honorary Members ===
The Commission's honorary members include its co-founders Lucian Boia and Bianca Valota Cavallotti, as well as Frank Ankersmit, Peter Burke, Jürgen Kocka, Jörn Rüsen, Masayuki Sato, Joan Wallach Scott, Romila Thapar, and, in memoriam, Natalie Zemon Davis, Georg Iggers, Richard Vann, and Hayden White.
