= Rechcigl =

Rechcigl is a surname. Notable people with the surname include:

- Miloslav Rechcigl, Sr. (1902–1973), Czech politician, miller and business executive
- Mila Rechcigl, Czech biochemist, nutritionist, and cancer researcher, writer, editor and historian
- Jack Rechcigl, American agronomist and environmental scientist
