= Jan Filip (historian) =

Czech prehistorian (1900–1981)

- Born: December 25, 1900; Chocnějovice
- Died: April 30, 1981 (aged 80); Prague
- Education: Charles University in Prague, Faculty of Arts, Charles University
- Occupation: prehistorian

Jan Filip (born 25 December 1900 in Chocnějovice, died 30 April 1981 in Prague) was a Czech archaeologist, prehistorian and pedagogue.

== Life and career ==
He mainly dealt with Celtic settlement in the territory of Czechoslovakia, the Bronze Age, and the Iron Age. His scholarly focus on La Tène and Hallstatt cultures helped structure Central European prehistoric chronology. He was a professor of prehistory at Charles University. His research often integrated settlement patterns, burial customs, and material culture, which became foundational for later scholarship. In 1955 he was appointed academician, from 1963 to 1974 he worked as director of the Archaeological Institute and member of the Czech Academy of Sciences. He wrote numerous scholarly publications, among them two of the fundamental reference works for archaeological research in Central Europe. He also founded the professional journal Archeologické rozhledy, published since 1949, in which he’d edit for more than 25 years.

Filip influenced the generations of Czech researchers who followed him, setting an example with his statements not hindered by national or political concerns. A great part of his work remains relevant to this day.

== Publications ==
- Die Urnenfelder und die Anfänge der Eisenzeit in Böhmen, Prague 1936/37.
- Kapitel aus der Kultur unserer Urzeit, Prague 1940.
- Kunsthandwerk in der Urzeit, Prague 1941.
- The Beginnings of Slaw Settlements in Czechoslovakia, Prague 1946.
- Keltové ve střední evropě. (Die Kelten in Mitteleuropa.) Monumenta Archaeologica 5. Verlag Akademie der Wissenschaften, Prague 1956.
- Die keltische Zivilisation, Prague 1961.
- Jan Filip et alia: Enzyklopädisches Handbuch zur Ur- und Frühgeschichte Europas. Akademia. Verlag der Akademie der Wissenschaften, Prague 1966-1969. 2 volumes.
