= Miloslav Rechcigl Sr. =

Miloslav Rechcigl Sr. (13 May 1904 – 27 May 1973) was a Czech politician, miller, business executive and editor for Radio Free Europe.

== Biography ==
Rechcigl was born in Chocnějovice near Mladá Boleslav in the Kingdom of Bohemia (present-day Czech Republic) on 13 May 1904. He was an active member of the Agrarian Party of Czechoslovakia before World War II. In 1935 he was elected to the Czechoslovak Parliament as its youngest member. In this capacity, he devoted his energies to economic problems, and served on several committees, relating to agriculture, industry and commerce, and international relations. He was a reporter for trade agreements for a number of countries, and for agricultural trade issues, in general.

The occupation of the country by the Nazis interrupted Rechcigl's political career. In spite of his active involvement in the underground resistance movement against the Nazis, as a non-communist political figure he became a target of persecution after the Communist takeover in 1948. After two failed attempts by the Secret Police to arrest him while he was hospitalized with a serious illness, he illegally crossed the border to Germany in May 1948. After some time in a Displaced persons camp in Germany, he went to Paris, where he became a member of the Executive Committee of the Council of Free Czechoslovakia. In February 1950, he arrived in the United States, where, after several years of manual work in New York City, he joined Radio Free Europe as chief editor of the Czechoslovak agricultural program. In 1956 he was transferred from New York to Munich, Germany. In 1970, he returned to the United States, where he died as a US naturalized citizen in Washington, D.C. on 27 May 1973.

Before entering the political scene, he operated a family flour mill in his native village, which he managed for his father from the age of 22, upon graduating from the Prague commercial academy. Two years later he assumed ownership of the mill and independently managed it, together with the adjacent farm.

Since 1928, he worked in various professional organizations of millers, including the Millers’ Association, Trade Millers’ Alliance of Czechoslovakia, Czech Territorial Union of Millers and the Central Union of Millers in Czechoslovakia of which he became executive secretary. He also founded the Millers' Cooperative and became its vice president. In 1938, through his initiative, the supreme organization of Czechoslovak millers was established under the name Central Office of Czechoslovak Millers and he became its president.

Furthermore, he also worked in professional agricultural organizations and became a member of all such organizations in his district. He was a council member of the Czech Agricultural Board in Prague, chairman of its economic section, a member of the cultivator committee, and a member of the Central Office of Agricultural Board in Czechoslovakia. He became a member of the Czechoslovak Agricultural Academy and officer of agricultural economists. In addition, he held membership in the auditing committee for the County Farmers' Savings Bank in Mnichovo Hradiště.

Rechcigl was vice-chairman of the water agricultural organization in his district and an officer of the Water Agricultural Union of Czechoslovakia, chairman of the Economic Council in Mladá Boleslav, executive secretary of the Economic Institute of North Bohemia, and vice president of the Union of Economic Councils, as well as chairman of the Committee for Regulating the River Jizera and its tributaries.

Rechcigl's extensive archival material has been deposited in the University of Minnesota's Immigration History Research Center (IHRC)

== Family ==
Rechcigl's son is biochemist and former Czechoslovak Society of Arts and Sciences President Mila Rechcigl.

== See also ==
- History of Czechoslovakia
- Radio Free Europe
