= Václav Hlavatý =

Czech-American mathematician

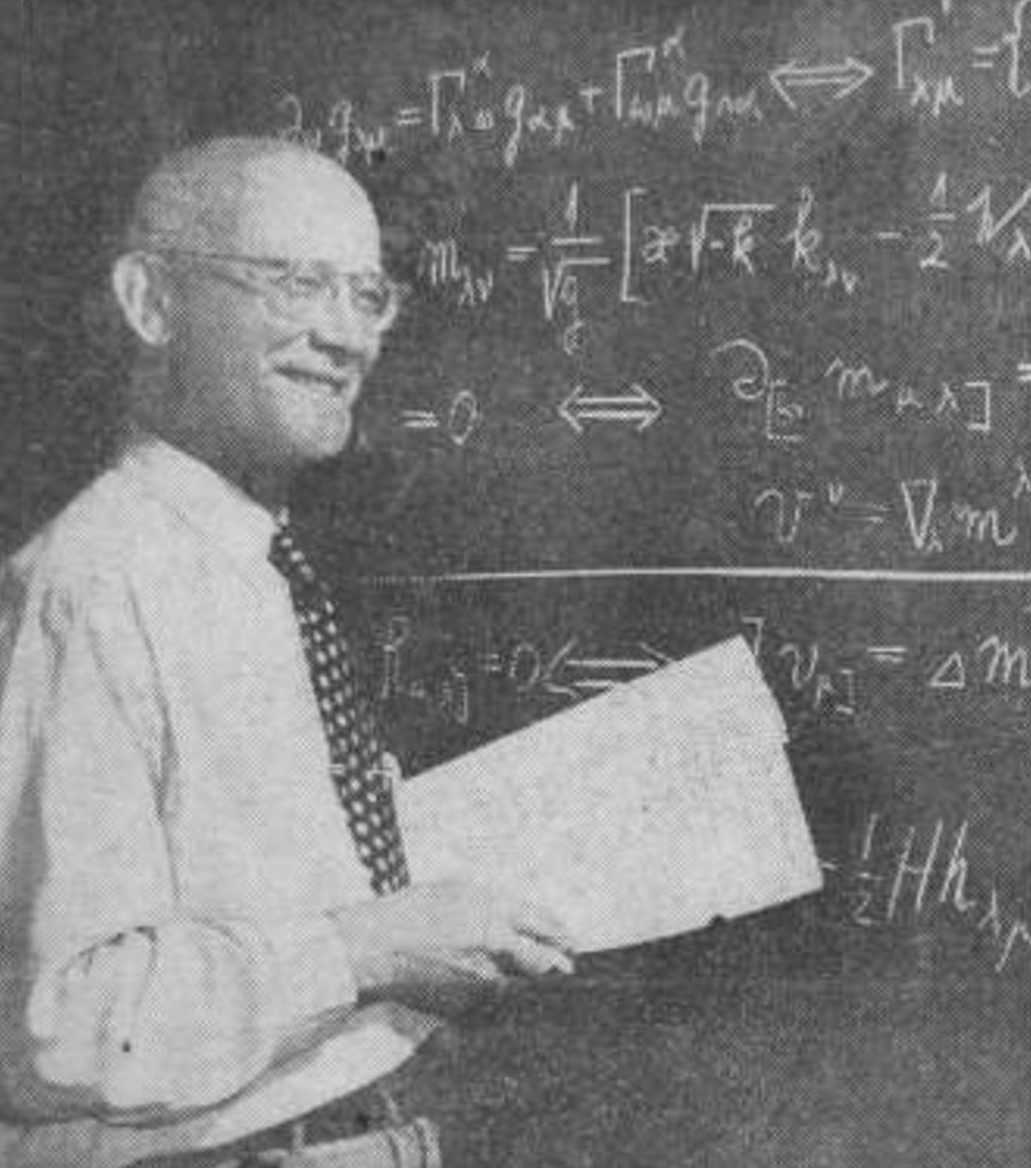
Václav portrait

Václav Hlavatý (27 January 1894 – 11 January 1969) was a noted Czech-American mathematician, who wrote on the theory of relativity and corresponded extensively with Albert Einstein on the subject. In particular, Hlavatý solved some very difficult equations relating to Einstein's Unified field theory, which was featured in the news media as one of the great scientific achievements of 1953. Einstein himself was reported to have said that if anyone could solve the equations it would be Professor Hlavatý, which proved to be the case.

He was born in Louny, Bohemia (now in the Czech Republic) and died in Bloomington, Indiana. He obtained his PhD in 1921 at the Charles University in Prague and during World War II participated in the Prague uprising, but his academic career was mainly at Indiana University, which he joined in 1948, and where he became Professor, later Emeritus, of Mathematics. A special book of mathematical essays was published in his honour. In 1958, he became the first President of the Czechoslovak Society of Arts and Sciences established in Washington DC by intellectuals of Czech and Slovak origin.

He was an Invited Speaker of the ICM in 1928 in Bologna and in 1936 in Oslo.

In 1931 he married Olga Neumannova, and they had a daughter, Olga.

== Some publications ==
=== Articles ===
- Hlavatý, V (1952). "The Elementary Basic Principles of the Unified Theory of Relativity". Proceedings of the National Academy of Sciences of the United States of America. 38 (3): 243–247. Bibcode:1952PNAS...38..243H. doi:10.1073/pnas.38.3.243. PMC 1063539. PMID 16589086.
- Hlavatý, V (1952). "The Einstein Connection of the Unified Theory of Relativity". Proceedings of the National Academy of Sciences of the United States of America. 38 (5): 415–419. Bibcode:1952PNAS...38..415H. doi:10.1073/pnas.38.5.415. PMC 1063575. PMID 16589114.
- Hlavatý, V (1952). "The Schrödinger Final Affine Field Laws". Proceedings of the National Academy of Sciences of the United States of America. 38 (12): 1052–1058. Bibcode:1952PNAS...38.1052H. doi:10.1073/pnas.38.12.1052. PMC 1063709. PMID 16589224.
- Hlavatý, V (1953). "The Spinor Connection in the Unified Einstein Theory of Relativity". Proceedings of the National Academy of Sciences of the United States of America. 39 (6): 501–506. Bibcode:1953PNAS...39..501H. doi:10.1073/pnas.39.6.501. PMC 1063813. PMID 16589296.
- Hlavatý, V (1953). "Connections Between Einstein's Two Unified Theories of Relativity". Proceedings of the National Academy of Sciences of the United States of America. 39 (6): 507–510. Bibcode:1953PNAS...39..507H. doi:10.1073/pnas.39.6.507. PMC 1063814. PMID 16589297.

=== Books ===
- Hlavatý, V. (1939). Differentialgeometrie der Kurven und Flächen und Tensorrechnung. Groningen: Noordhoff.
- Hlavatý, V. (1953). Differential line geometry. Translated by H. Levy. Groningen: Noordhoff.
- Hlavatý, V. (1957). Geometry of Einstein's Unified Field Theory. Groningen: Noordhoff. Reprinted as ISBN 978-1-178-77017-9.
