= Jack Rechcigl =

American agronomist, soil and environmental scientist

John Edward Rechcigl
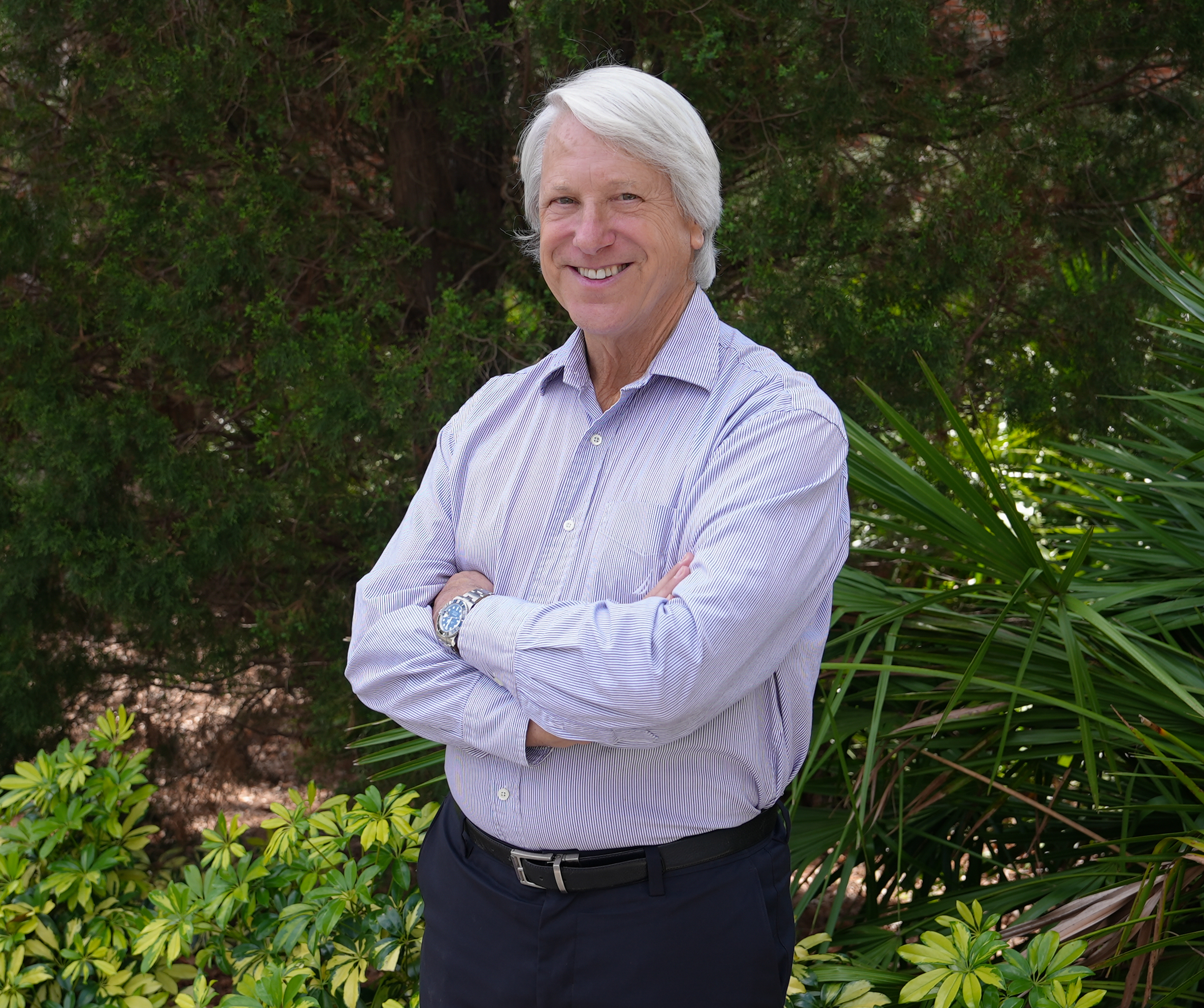
- Born: February 27, 1960 (age 66); Washington, D.C.
- Education: University of Delaware (B.S.) Virginia Polytechnic Institute and State University (M.S., Ph.D.)
- Occupations: Professor, Center Director
- Employer: University of Florida
- Spouse: Nancy Rechcigl
- Children: 3
- Website: https://ifas.ufl.edu

John "Jack" Edward Rechcigl (born February 27, 1960) is an American agronomist and environmental scientist. He is a professor and research administrator at the University of Florida. His work has included agricultural research in soil science, fertilizer management, and water quality.

== Early life and education ==
Rechcigl was born in Washington, D.C. and grew up in Rockville, Maryland. His parents, Mila Rechcigl and Eva Edwards Rechcigl, were refugees from Communist and Nazi-occupied Czechoslovakia.

He earned a Bachelor of Science degree in botany from the University of Delaware in 1982 and continued his studies in pedology at Virginia Tech, receiving a master's degree in 1983 and a PhD in 1986.

== Career ==
Rechcigl joined the University of Florida in 1986 as an assistant professor of Soil Science and Water Quality. He was promoted to associate professor in 1991 and full professor in 1996. In 1999, he was named a University of Florida Research Foundation Professor.

In 2000, he was appointed associate director of the Gulf Coast Research and Education Center (GCREC) at the Institute of Food and Agricultural Sciences in Bradenton, Florida. He later completed administrative training at Harvard University and became center director in 2001.

Rechcigl was the interim director of the Fort Lauderdale Research and Education Center (FLREC) since 2020 and became the center director in 2021.

Professionally, Rechcigl was elected a fellow of the American Society of Agronomy in 1998, and the Soil Science Society of America in 1999. He was also elected as a fellow of the Czechoslovak Society of Arts and Sciences in 2003.

== Authorship ==
Rechigl edited or co-edited five books for the Agriculture and Environment series, published by Lewis/CRC Press:

- Rechcigl, Jack E., ed. (1995). Soil Amendments: Impacts on Biotic System. Boca Raton, Florida: Lewis Publishers. ISBN 0873718607.
- Rechcigl, Jack E., ed. (1995). Soil Amendments and Environmental Quality. Boca Raton, Florida: Lewis Publishers. ISBN 0873718593.
- Rechcigl, Jack E., ed. (1997). Environmentally Safe Approaches to Crop Disease Control. Boca Raton, FL: CRC Press. ISBN 0849326273. (with Nancy A. Rechcigl)
- Rechcigl, Jack E., ed. (1998). Biological and Biotechnological Control of Insect Pests. Boca Raton, Florida: CRC Press. ISBN 1566704790. (with Nancy A. Rechcigl)
- Rechcigl, Jack E., ed. (1999). Insect Pest Management: Techniques for Environmental Protection. Boca Raton, Florida: CRC Press. ISBN 9781566704786. (with Nancy A. Rechcigl)
