= Mila Rechcigl =

Czech-American researcher (born 1930)

Miloslav Rechcigl
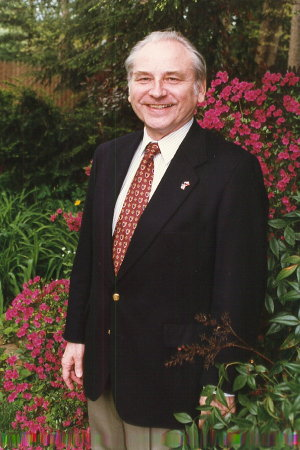
- Rechcigl in 2007
- Born: Miloslav Rechcigl Jr. 30 July 1930 (age 96); Mladá Boleslav, Czechoslovakia
- Other name: Mila
- Education: Cornell University (BS, MSN, PhD)
- Occupations: Biochemist; nutritionist; cancer researcher; writer; editor; historian; bibliographer; genealogist
- Spouse: Eva Rechcigl
- Children: 2
- Parent: Miloslav Rechcigl Sr.

Miloslav "Mila" Rechcigl Jr. (born 30 July 1930) is a Czech-American biochemist, nutritionist, cancer researcher, writer, editor, historian, bibliographer, and genealogist. She is a founding member of the Czechoslovak Society of Arts and Sciences and served as its president from 1974 to 1978 and from 1994 to 2006.

== Early life ==
Rechcigl was born on 30 July 1930 in Mladá Boleslav, Czechoslovakia. His father, Miloslav Rechcigl Sr., was a politician in pre-World War II Czechoslovakia, serving as the youngest member of the Czechoslovak Parliament and president of the Millers Association of Bohemia and Moravia. After the communist takeover in 1948, Rechcigl left the country, immigrated to the United States in 1950, and became a naturalized citizen in 1955. He studied at Cornell University from 1951 to 1958, earning BS, MSN, and PhD degrees, with a focus on biochemistry, nutrition, physiology, and food science.

== Career ==
He spent two years conducting research at the National Institutes of Health in Bethesda, Maryland, as a Postdoctoral Research Fellow. Subsequently, he was appointed as research biochemist to the staff of the Laboratory of Biochemistry at the National Cancer Institute. During 1968–1969, he participated in a one-year USPHS executive training program in health administration, research management, grants administration, and science policy.

He was subsequently appointed Special Assistant for Nutrition and Health in the Health Services and Mental Health Administration. In 1970, he joined the U.S. Agency for International Development, which was then part of the U.S. Department of State, as a nutrition advisor and later became responsible for managing its research program.

=== Research activities ===
Rechcigl initially specialized in amino acid metabolism, including the utilization of D-amino acids and non-specific forms of nitrogen. He later investigated the relationship between protein and vitamin A, finding that the amount and biological value of dietary protein are necessary for the efficient conversion of carotene to vitamin A. He also studied metabolic changes during cachexia in tumor-bearing animals. He observed the depression of enzyme catalase in the livers and kidneys of tumor hosts, which some investigators attributed to a hypothetical substance called toxohormone. This hypothesis was disproved by Rechcigl's findings of significant enzyme levels in liver tumors themselves.

A number of his studies dealt with the question of enzyme turnover in vivo. Using specific metabolic inhibitors, he evaluated relative rates of synthesis and degradation of the enzyme catalase under a variety of physiological, pathological, and pharmacological conditions. These studies led to the conclusion that the rate of synthesis, rather than the rate of destruction, may be the preferential way the mammalian organism controls its enzyme levels.

His finding of significantly different levels of catalase activity in certain substrains of mice, which were under genetic control, provided a model for pursuing fundamental research in biochemical genetics in the mammalian system. The analyses of the first, second, and backcross generations between high-enzyme and low-enzyme mouse substrains showed that the difference was due to a single autosomal gene pair with low dominance over high. Using specific metabolic inhibitors, it was subsequently found that the genetic difference between the two substrains lies primarily in the markedly increased rate of the enzyme destruction in the liver of one of the substrains. This was in contrast to all normal rats and mice studied previously, where rates of enzyme destruction seemed to be almost constant. Although transient alteration in the rate of enzyme degradation has been observed under certain physiological conditions with other enzyme systems, the observation on catalase was considered the first demonstration of such a regulatory mechanism under genetic control.

He also conducted studies on the morphology, biochemistry and physiology of microbodies, in collaboration with Prof. Z. Hruban of the University of Chicago. This collaboration resulted in the monograph called "Micro bodies and Related Particles" (1969).

== Scientific publications ==
=== Monographs ===
- Microbodies and Related Particles. (International Review of Cytology. Supplement No. 1). New York and London, Academic Press, 1969. 296 pp.; also in Russian.
- Enzyme Synthesis and Degradation in Mammalian Systems. Basel-Munchen-Paris-London-New York-Sydney: S. Karger, 1971. 477 pp.
- Food, Nutrition and Health. A Multidisciplinary Treatise Addressed to the Major Nutrition Problems from a Worldwide Perspective. Basel-Munchen- Paris-London-New York-Sydney: S. Karger, 1973. 516 pp.
- Man, Food, and Nutrition. Strategies and Technological Measures for Alleviating the World Food Problem. Cleveland, OH: CRC Press, 1973. 344 pp.
- World Food Problem. A Selective Bibliography of Reviews. Cleveland, OH: CRC Press, 1975. 211 pp.
- Comparative Animal Nutrition. Vol. 1. Carbohydrates, Lipids, and accessory Growth Factors. Basel-Munchen-Paris-London-New York-Sydney: S. Karger, 1976. 223 pp.
- Comparative Animal Nutrition. Vol. 2 Nutrient Elements and Toxicants. Basel-Munchen-Paris-London-New York-Sydney: S. Karger, 1977. 208 pp.
- Comparative Animal Nutrition. Vol. 3. Nitrogen, Electrolytes, Water and Energy Metabolism. Basel-Munchen-Paris-London-New York- Sydney: S.Karger, 1979. 260 pp.
- Comparative Animal Nutrition. Vol. 4. Physiology of Growth and Nutrition. Basel-Munchen-Paris-London-New York-Sydney: S. Karger, 1981. 341 pp.
- Nutrition and World Food Problem. Basel-Munchen-Paris-London-New York-Sydney: S. Karger, 1979. 375 pp.

=== Handbooks ===
- CRC Handbook Series in Nutrition and Food. Nutritional Requirements. Vol. 1. Comparative and Quantitative Requirements. Cleveland, OH: CRC Press, 1977. 551 pp.
- CRC Handbook Series in Nutrition and Food. Sect. G. Diets, Culture Media, Food Supplements. Vol. 1. Diets for Mammals. Cleveland, OH: CRC Press, 1977. 645 pp.
- CRC Handbook Series in Nutrition and Food. Sect. G. Diets, Culture Media, Food Supplements. Vol. 2. Food Habits of and Diets for Invertebrates and Vertebrates. Zoo diets. Cleveland, OH: CRC Press, 1977. 462 pp.
- CRC Handbook Series in Nutrition and Food. Sect. G. Diets, Culture Media, Food Supplements. Vol. 3. Culture Media for Microorganisms and Plants. Cleveland, OH: CRC Press, 1978. 647 pp.
- CRC Handbook Series in Nutrition and Food. Sect. G. Diets, Culture Media, Food Supplements. Vol. 4. Culture Media for Cells, Organs and Embryos. Cleveland, OH: CRC Press, 1977. 469 pp.
- CRC Handbook Series in Nutrition and Food. Sect. E. Nutritional Disorders. Vol. 1. Effect of Nutrient Excesses and Toxicities in Animals and Man. West Palm Beach, FL: CRC Press, 1978. 518 pp.
- CRC Handbook Series in Nutrition and Food. Sect. E. Nutritional Disorders. Vol. 2. Effect of Nutrient Deficiencies in Animals. West Palm Beach, FL: CRC Press, 1978. 548 pp.
- CRC Handbook Series in Nutrition and Food. Sect. E. Nutritional Disorders. Vol. 3. Effect of Nutrient Deficiencies in Man. West Palm Beach, FL: CRC Press, 1978. 388 pp.
- CRC Handbook of Nutritional Requirements in a Functional Context. Vol. 1. Development and Conditions of Physiologic Stress. Boca Raton, Florida: CRC Press, 1981. 542 pp.
- CRC Handbook of Nutritional Requirements in a Functional context. vol. 2. Hematopoiesis and Resistance to Physical Stress. Boca Raton, Florida: CRC Press, 1981. 594 pp.
- CRC Handbook of Nutritive Value of Processed Food. vol. 1. Food for Human Use. Boca Raton, Florida: CRC Press, 1982. 679 pp.
- CRC Handbook of Nutritive Value of Processed Food. Vol. 2. Animal Feedstuffs. Boca Raton, Florida: CRC Press, 1982. 499 pp.
- CRC Handbook of Agricultural Productivity. Vol. 1. Plant Productivity. Boca Raton, Florida: CRC Press, 1982. 468 pp.
- CRC Handbook of Agricultural Productivity. vol. 2. Animal Productivity. Boca Raton, Florida: CRC Press, 1982. 396 pp. CRC Handbook of Nutritional Supplements. Vol. 1. Human Use. Boca Raton, Florida: CRC Press, 1983. 564 pp.
- CRC Handbook of Nutritional Supplements. Vol. 2. Agricultural Use. Boca Raton, Florida: CRC Press, 1983. 412 pp.
- CRC Handbook of Naturally Occurring Food Toxicants. Boca Raton. FL: CRC Press, 1983. 339 pp.
- CRC Handbook of Food-borne Diseases of Biological Origin. Boca Raton, Florida: CRC Press, 1983. 518 pp.
- The Rechcigl Genealogy: The Ancestry and Descendants of Mila Rechcigl and Eva Edwards with Information on Allied Families. Authors' Tranquility Press, 2023. 948 pp. ISBN 978-1961908161.

== Czech-American activism ==
In addition to his scientific work as a researcher and science administrator, Rechcigl spent nearly 50 years working with the Czechoslovak Society of Arts and Sciences (SVU), an international organization headquartered in Washington, D.C. He was responsible for the first two of the Society's World Congresses. He also edited the Congress lectures and arranged for their publication, under the titles "The Czechoslovak Contribution to World Culture" and "Czechoslovakia Past and Present."

Rechcigl was also involved with most of the subsequent SVU World Congresses, including SVU congresses in Prague, Brno, Bratislava, Washington, D.C., Plzeň, Olomouc and České Budějovice. Prior to his last term as the SVU President (2004–06), he held similar posts during 1974–1976, 1976–1978, and continuously from 1994 until 2004.

In 1999, in conjunction with President Václav Havel's visit to Minnesota, he organized a conference at the University of Minnesota on "Czech and Slovak America: Quo Vadis?"

Together with his wife Eva, he published eight editions of the SVU Biographical Directory, the last of which was printed in Prague in 2003. He helped launch a new English periodical Kosmas. Czechoslovak and Central European Journal. He also proposed the establishment of the SVU Research Institute and the creation of the SVU Commission for Cooperation with Czechoslovakia and its successor states, the Czech Republic and Slovakia, which provided research management workshops for Czech and Slovak scientists following the Velvet Revolution in 1989. Under the sponsorship of the SVU Research Institute, and together with his colleagues, he conducted a series of workshops on research management and grantsmanship for scientists and scholars, as well as for administrators and science policy makers, at Czech and Slovak universities, the Academies of Sciences (Academy of Sciences of the Czech Republic, Slovak Academy of Sciences) and the government.

He established the National Heritage Commission with the aim of preserving Czech and Slovak cultural heritage in America. Under its support, he undertook a comprehensive survey of Czech-related historic sites and archival materials in the US. Based on this survey, he prepared a detailed listing, Czech-American Historic Sites, Monuments, and Memorials, which was published through the courtesy of Palacký University of Olomouc (2004). The second part of the survey, bearing the title Czechoslovak American Archivalia, was also published by Palacky University (2004).

Rechcigl has studied the history, genealogy, and bibliography of Czech Americans and Slovak Americans. His publications include works on the early immigrants from the Czech lands and Slovakia, including the immigration of Moravian Brethren to America. He has also worked on the cultural contributions of Czech Americans and Slovak Americans. A selection of his biographical portraits of prominent Czech Americans from the 17th century to date has been published in Prague, under the title Postavy nasí Ameriky (Personalities of our America). On the occasion of his 75th birthday, the Society published a collection of his essays, under the title "Czechs and Slovaks in America", as a part of the East European Monographs series, distributed by the Columbia University Press.

== Recognition ==
Rechcigl is a member of the Honor Society of Phi Kappa Phi, the Scientific Research Society of the Sigma Xi, and the Cosmos Club. He is an Honorary Member of the International Honor Society of Delta Tau Kappa and the Czechoslovak Society of Arts and Sciences. He was elected a Fellow of the American Association for the Advancement of Science (AAAS), a Fellow of the Washington Academy of Sciences and a Fellow of the American Institute of Chemists (AIC), and a Fellow of the International College of Applied Nutrition.

In 1991, the Czechoslovak Academy of Sciences awarded him the Hlavka Memorial Medal on the occasion of its 100th anniversary. In 1997 he received a prize "Gratias agit" from the Ministry of Foreign Affairs of the Czech Republic. In 1999, Rechcigl received the Presidential Memorial Medal from Czech President Václav Havel. He was also given an honorary title Nebraska Admiral ("Admiral of the Great Navy of the State of Nebraska") by the Governor of Nebraska Mike Johanns along with the key to the capital of Nebraska by the Mayor of Lincoln, Nebraska. The SVU Prague Chapter also awarded him the 2002 Prague SVU Award. In 2005, the Minister of Foreign Affairs of the Czech Republic, Cyril Svoboda awarded him the Jan Masaryk Medal for his contributions in preserving and fostering relations between the Czech Republic and the United States. In 2006 he received the Comenius Award from the Czech Center Museum Houston.

In 2023, Rechcigl was honored by the Czechoslovak Society of Arts and Sciences (SVU) for his lifetime contributions to the advancement of Czech-American relations and his role in establishing the SVU World Congresses.

== Personal life ==
Mila Rechcigl lives with his wife, Eva, in the Washington, D.C. area. They have two children, Jack and Karen, who live in Florida. Jack Rechcigl is a professor of soil and water sciences at the University of Florida and director of Gulf Coast Research and Education Center in Wimauma.
