= Gratias Agit Award =

The Gratias Agit Award (Czech: Cena Gratias Agit) is an annual recognition awarded by the Ministry of Foreign Affairs of the Czech Republic "for the promotion of the good name of the Czech Republic abroad". It was established in 1997 and awards presentations have generally been conducted at the Czernin Palace.

== Partial list of recipients ==
Year	Recipient	citation
1998	Mila Rechcigl	
2002	Wilma Iggers	
2006	Norodom Sihamoni	
2011	Tom Stoppard	
2013	Petr Esterka	
2014	Patrick Herminie	
2017	Martina Sáblíková, Jiří Bělohlávek	
2022	Tamara Adasan, Leszek Engelking, Samir Yousef Salim Hazbun, Karl Ayikai Laryea	
