= Mířkov =

- Municipality
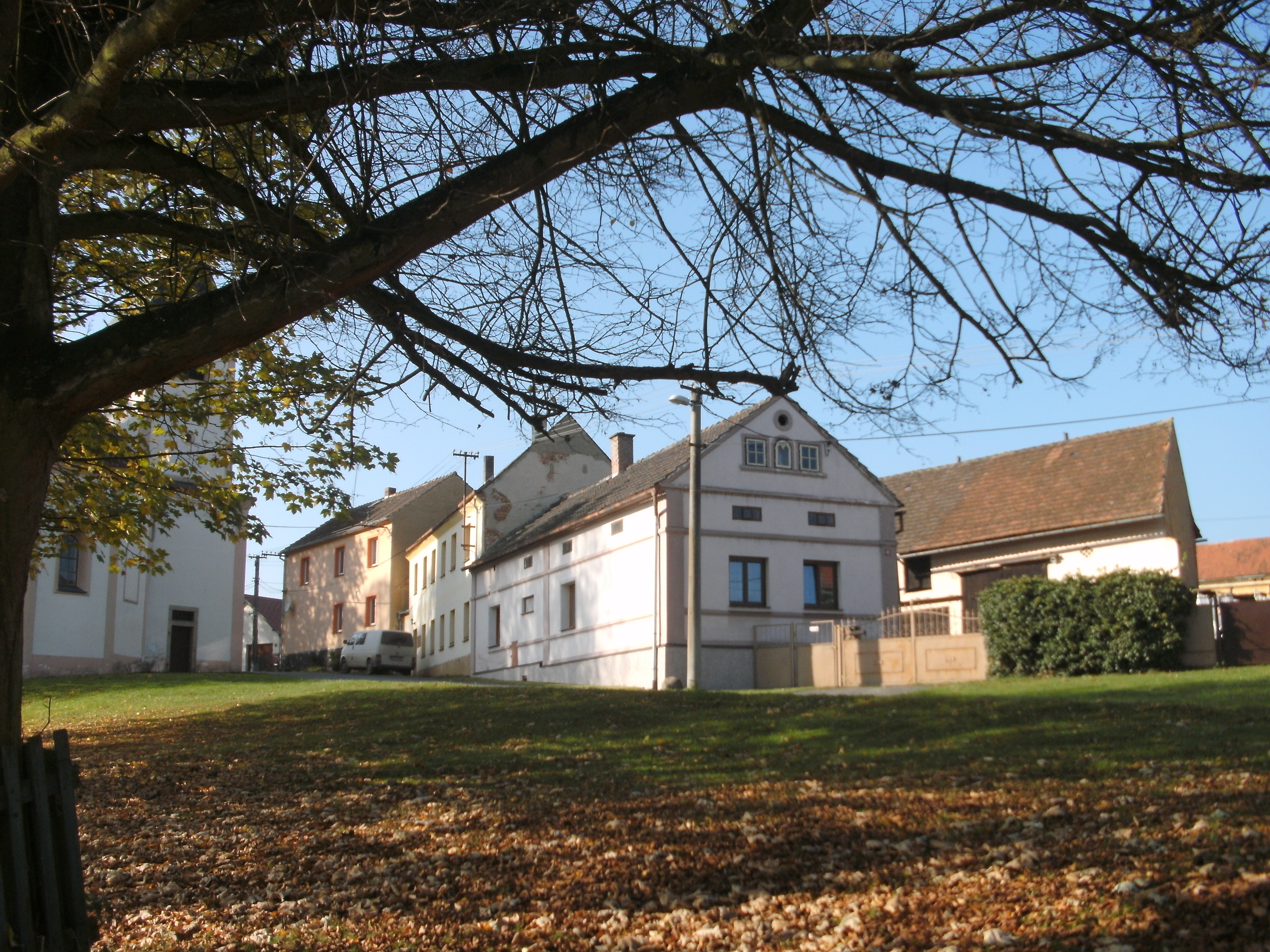
- Centre of Mířkov

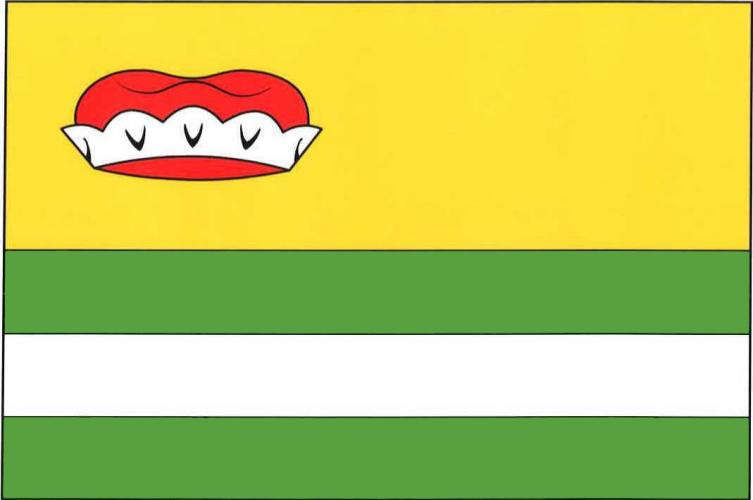
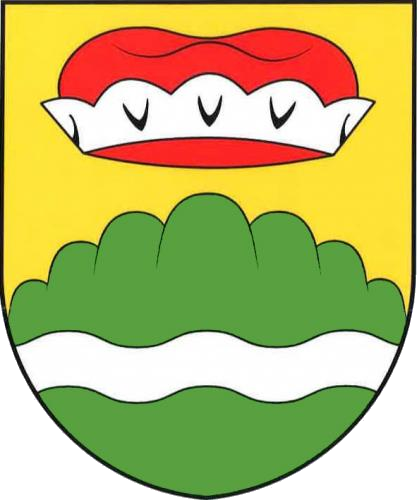
- Flag Coat of arms

- Location in the Czech Republic
- Coordinates: 49°35′22″N 12°52′51″E
- Country: Czech Republic
- Region: Plzeň
- District: Domažlice
- First mentioned: 1158

Area
  - Total: 17.61 km^{2} (6.80 sq mi)
- Elevation: 463 m (1,519 ft)

Population (2026-01-01)
  - Total: 319
  - Density: 18.1/km^{2} (46.9/sq mi)
- Time zone: UTC+1 (CET)
  - Summer (DST): UTC+2 (CEST)
- Postal code: 346 01
- Website: www.mirkov.cz

Mířkov (German: Mirschikau) is a municipality and village in Domažlice District in the Plzeň Region of the Czech Republic. It has about 300 inhabitants.

Mířkov lies approximately 19 kilometres (12 mi) north of Domažlice, 39 km (24 mi) south-west of Plzeň, and 123 km (76 mi) south-west of Prague.

== Administrative division ==
Mířkov consists of two municipal parts (in brackets population according to the 2021 census):

- Mířkov (222)
- Křakov (85)

== Demographics ==
Historical population
| Year | Pop. | ±% |
|---|---|---|
| 1869 | 612 | — |
| 1880 | 563 | −8.0% |
| 1890 | 560 | −0.5% |
| 1900 | 546 | −2.5% |
| 1910 | 650 | +19.0% |
| 1921 | 673 | +3.5% |
| 1930 | 684 | +1.6% |
| 1950 | 351 | −48.7% |
| 1961 | 378 | +7.7% |
| 1970 | 324 | −14.3% |
| 1980 | 273 | −15.7% |
| 1991 | 238 | −12.8% |
| 2001 | 316 | +32.8% |
| 2011 | 256 | −19.0% |
| 2021 | 307 | +19.9% |
Source: Censuses

== Notable people ==
- Wilma Iggers (1921–2025), Germanist and cultural historian
