= Olufunke Adeboye =

Nigerian professor and social historian

- Born: Olufunke Ojo; Ibadan
- Occupation: University professor
- Title: Dean, Faculty of Arts, University of Lagos
- Awards: 2012 Gerti Hesseling Prize

Academic background
- Education: University of Ibadan

Academic work
- Discipline: History
- Sub-discipline: Social history
- Institutions: University of Lagos
- Main interests: elitism, pentecostalism, religiosity and gender

Olufunke Adeboye is a Nigerian professor of Social History at the Department of History and Strategic Studies of the University of Lagos, Nigeria, where she was formerly Dean of the Faculty of Arts. Adeboye's research interests include gender in Africa, pre-colonial and colonial Nigerian history, nineteenth and twentieth century Yoruba society, African historiography, and Pentecostalism in West Africa. In 2013, she won the Gerti Hesseling Prize awarded by AEGIS (Africa-Europe Group for Interdisciplinary Studies) for the best journal article published in a European African Studies journal by an African scholar.

== Background ==
Olufunke Adeboye (née Òjó) was born in Ibadan, Nigeria. She completed her secondary schooling at Our Lady's Girls' High School, Ile-Ife, Osun State, Nigeria in 1983. She proceeded to the University of Ibadan, Nigeria where she earned Bachelor of Arts (B.A.), Masters of Arts (M.A.), and Doctor of Philosophy (PhD.) degrees in History in 1988, 1990, and 1997 respectively. She started her teaching career as an Assistant Lecturer at Ogun State University (now Olabisi Onabanjo University), Ago Iwoye, Nigeria in 1991. In 1999, she moved to the then Department of History of the University of Lagos as a Lecturer I, rising through the ranks until she was appointed a full Professor in March 2011.

== Career ==
In 2006, Adeboye was a Visiting Research Associate at the Harriet Tubman Institute, York University, Toronto, Canada. She has held Visiting Research Fellowships at the Centre of West African Studies, University of Birmingham, UK (2004); the University of Massachusetts, Amherst and Amherst College, USA (2006); and at the Centre of African Studies, University of Cambridge, UK (2009/2010). In 2013, the journal article, "A Church in a Cinema Hall?’: Pentecostal Appropriation of Public Space in Nigeria," published in the Journal of Religion in Africa won her the Gerti Hesseling Prize awarded by AEGIS (Africa-Europe Group for Interdisciplinary Studies) for the best journal article published in a European African Studies journal by an African scholar.

Adeboye is the current vice president of the International Commission for the History and Theory of Historiography. In 2018, she was appointed the Director of the Adeboye Centre for Peace and Good Governance at Redeemer's University. She served as the Head of the Department of History and Strategic Studies, University of Lagos, from August 2013 to July 2016.

Beyond academe, Adeboye has served her country in a number of capacities. She was a member of the expert team set up by the Federal Government of Nigeria in 2013 to prepare the Country Report on “100 Years of the Nigerian Woman” to mark the centenary anniversary of the country. She was also a member of the country's Presidential Advisory Committee on National Dialogue set up in 2013 to provide the template for the 2014 National Conference.

Adeboye has authored articles in journals domiciled in various academic institutions. Her latest book (co-edited with Afe Adogame and Corey Williams), Fighting in God’s Name: Religion, Conflict and Tolerance in Local and Global Perspectives, is being published by Lexington Books. Her current research on religion and development, among other things, seeks to deconstruct existing knowledge about anti-development orientations of religion. She currently sits on the board of African Historical Review, Journal of Religion in Africa and Religion and Society: Advances in Research. She was a past editor of the Lagos Historical Review, a journal of history domiciled in the Department of History and Strategic Studies, University of Lagos, which she edited from 2008-2016.

Adeboye is a member of the Association of African Historians, Historical Society of Nigeria, Society for Pentecostal Studies, Cleveland TN, USA; African Studies Association, North America; Canadian Association of African Studies; Council for the Development of Social Science Research in Africa (CODESRIA); Nigerian Academy of Letters (NAL); and Society for Peace Studies and Practice (SPSP).

== Selected publications ==
- “Framing Female Leadership on Stage and Screen in Yorubaland: Efunsetan Aniwura Revisited”, Gender & History 30, no.3, (October 2018): 666-681.
- “Explaining the Growth and Legitimation of the Pentecostal Movement in Africa”, in Adeshina Afolayan, Jumoke Yacob-Haliso and Toyin Falola (eds.), Pentecostalism and Politics in Africa (Cham, Switzerland: Palgrave Macmillan, 2018), 25-40.
- “Home Burials, Church Graveyards and Public Cemeteries: Transformation in Ibadan Mortuary Practice, 1853-1960”, Journal of Traditions and Beliefs (Cleveland State University, Ohio, USA), 4 (2016) https://engagedscholarship.csuohio.edu/cgi/viewcontent.cgi?article=1060&context=jtb
- "‘A Church in a Cinema Hall?’: Pentecostal Appropriation of Public Space in Nigeria," Journal of Religion in Africa 42, no. 2 (2012): 145-171.
- Adeboye, O. “Reading the Diary of Akinpelu Obisesan in Colonial Africa”, African Studies Review 51, no. 2 (2008): 75-97.
- “‘Iku Ya J’Esin’: Politically Motivated Suicide, Social Honor and Chieftaincy Politics in Early Colonial Ibadan”, Canadian Journal of African Studies 41, no. 2 (2007): 189-225.
- “The Changing Conception of Elderhood in Ibadan, 1830-2000”, Nordic Journal of African Studies 16, no. 2 (2007): 261-278.
- “Arrowhead of Nigerian Pentecostalism: The Redeemed Christian Church of God, 1952-2004”, Pneuma: Journal of the Society of Pentecostal Studies 29, no. 1 (Spring 2007): 23-56.
- “Diaries as Cultural and Intellectual Histories” in Toyin Falola and Ann Genova (eds.), Yoruba Identity and Power Politics (Rochester, NY: University of Rochester Press, 2006), 74-95. JSTOR,
- “Pentecostal Challenges in Africa and Latin America: A Comparative Focus on Nigeria and Brazil”, Afrika Zamani 11&12 (2003-2004): 136-159. https://www.codesria.org/IMG/pdf/8-Adeboye
