= Wilma Iggers =

- Born: Wilma Abeles; 23 March 1921; Mířkov, Czechoslovakia
- Died: 24 February 2025 (aged 103); Buffalo, New York, United States
- Spouse: Georg Iggers

Wilma Abeles Iggers (23 March 1921 – 24 February 2025) was a Czech-born German-American Germanist and cultural historian. She is known for her work on Czechs, Germans and Jews in Central Europe and Bohemia, and publications such as The Jews of Bohemia and Moravia and Women of Prague. Ethnic Diversity and Cultural Change from the Eighteenth Century to the Present.

She fled Czechoslovakia in 1938 due to the threat of National Socialism and emigrated to Canada with her family. She received her B.A. from McMaster University, and her M.A. and PhD from the University of Chicago where she met her husband Georg Iggers. She taught at a variety of institutions across the United States including the historically black Philander Smith College, Dillard University, and Canisius University.

== Early life ==
=== Childhood in Czechoslovakia ===
She was born in the village of Mířkov near Horšovský Týn in Czechoslovakia to a Czech-Jewish family. Her mother, Elsa Abeles was from Waldmünchen in Bavaria and her father, Karl Abeles, was from the Bohemian countryside. Iggers attended elemntary school in Horšovský Týn. In 1927, Iggers began attending a German speaking girl's grade school, before enrolling in a Czech high school in 1932. She attended this school for only one year, to learn how to speak Czech so that she could attend Gymnasium. In the September of 1938 Iggers began to notice rising tensions between Germans and Czechs. During this time, she also began to experience an increase in antisemitism directed towards her, she cites the walls of her house being vandalised with swastikas, or acquaintances spitting at her feet, as a couple of examples.

=== Emigration to Canada ===
In 1938, Iggers fled Czechoslovakia with her extended family and emigrated to Ontario, Canada. The idea of emigration and the threat of National Socialism first began to be seriously discussed by the family after the Anschluss on 13 March 1938. Their actual emigration came quite suddenly in late 1938 when they received rumours that the Nazis were planning an attack against Jews on that day. In the early hours of the morning the family packed as much as they could and left, travelling to Prague, then Belgium, and finally to Canada.

== Education ==
Iggers received her bachelor's degree from McMaster University in 1942. To attend graduate school, she applied for a variety of scholarships and ended up accepting one from the University of Chicago. She attended the university from 1943 to 1952 and earned both an M.A. and a PhD. She wrote her Master's paper on the Eger Corpus Christi play of around 1500, as well as the Egerländer dialect. For her dissertation she wrote about Karl Kraus under the supervision of Professor Arnold Bergstraesser. Her initial defence, scheduled for 4 October 1951 had to be postponed due to her going into labour, and it was rescheduled for 6 months later.

== Career ==
During her career, Iggers specialised in German and Czech literature, as well as the history of Jews in the Czech lands. She began by teaching at historically black colleges in the southern United States. She and her husband Georg Iggers, who she met at the University of Chicago and married in 1948, both joined the faculty of Philander Smith College in Little Rock, Arkansas, in 1950. There, she taught French, German and Spanish. She also took on additional teaching over the summer to teach an upper-level English course. They both taught there until 1957 when they moved to New Orleans, Louisiana to teach at Dillard University until 1961. After this, Iggers and her husband took some time to travel to Germany and France where they lived first in Le Mée and later on in Göttingen. After returning to the United States they returned to Dillard for a few months but soon, in 1963, moved to Chicago where Iggers joined the faculty of Loyola University. In 1965 she and her family moved to Buffalo where she taught German literature at Canisius College. She was promoted to professor in 1974.

Most of Iggers' scholarly work consisted of studying texts about Jews in the Czech lands. She had a particular interest in the social and cultural history of the area and its people. This research led to the publication of her book The Jews of Bohemia and Moravia which is a collation of texts on the topic from the last 250 years. In 1990 she began to split her life between the United States and Germany, and she retired from teaching permanently in 1991.

Her political engagement began during her time at Philander Smith College in Little Rock where both she and her husband became members of the NAACP. After the Cuban Missile Crisis, Iggers, her husband Georg and a professor named Mary Allen founded the organisation "The New Orleans Council for Peaceful Alternatives" which organised demonstrations against nuclear weapons. In the summer of 1964, she also became actively opposed to the Vietnam War and was part of a group of colleagues at various Chicago universities that organised demonstrations against the war, organised teach-ins, and placed advertisements in newspapers. She and her husband also helped to council people to avoid the draft through options like conscientious objection and medical hardship exemptions.

== Honours and awards ==
In 2002, Iggers received on honorary citizenship from the town she grew up in. In 2004, she received the Gratias Agit Award from the Czech Foreign Ministry.

== Selected publications ==
- Iggers, Wilma (1986). Die Juden in Böhmen und Mähren: ein historisches Lesebuch (in German). München: Beck. ISBN 978-3-406-31105-5.
- Iggers, Wilma, ed. (1992). The Jews of Bohemia and Moravia: A Historical Reader. Detroit, MI: Wayne State University Press. ISBN 978-0-8143-2228-4.
- Iggers, Wilma Abeles; American Council of Learned Societies (1995). Women of Prague: ethnic diversity and social change from the eighteenth century to the present. Providence: Berghahn Books. ISBN 978-1-57181-008-3.
- Iggers, Wilma Abeles; Iggers, Georg G. (2002). Zwei Seiten der Geschichte: Lebensbericht aus unruhigen Zeiten (in German). Göttingen: Vandenhoeck & Ruprecht. ISBN 978-3-525-36265-5.
- Iggers, Wilma Abeles; Iggers, Georg Gerson (2006). Two lives in uncertain times: facing the challenges of the 20th century as scholars and citizens. New York: Berghahn Books. ISBN 978-1-84545-138-7.
- Iggers, Wilma (2021). Böhmische Juden : eine Kindheit auf dem Lande. Hentrich & Hentrich, Leipzig. OCLC 1275392543.
