= Journal of the Philosophy of History =

- Discipline: Philosophy of History, Philosophy of Science, Philosophy
- Language: English
- Edited by: Chiel van den Akker

Publication details
- History: 2007–present
- Publisher: Brill (Netherlands)
- Frequency: 3 times per year
- Open access: no

Standard abbreviations
- ISO 4: J. Philos. Hist.

Indexing
- ISSN: 1872-261X (print); 1872-2636 (web)
- OCLC no.: 863081525

Links
- Journal homepage

Journal of the Philosophy of History (JPH) is a peer-reviewed academic philosophy journal focusing on the philosophy of history and historical theory published three times a year, by Brill Publishers. It is one of a few journals with an explicit focus on philosophical issues pertaining to history and historiography. The journal contains original research articles, book reviews, and extended review essays.

JPH was founded in 2007 by the Dutch philosopher of history Frank Ankersmit. From 2017 to 2022 it has been under the editorship of Jouni-Matti Kuukkanen, a philosopher of history and science and director of the Centre for Philosophical Studies of History at the University of Oulu.. From 2022 onwards, the journal is edited by Chiel van den Akker, a philosopher of history at the Vrije Universiteit Amsterdam. The editorial board consists of Giuseppina D'Oro (Keele University), Allan Megill (University of Virginia), Marek Tamm (Tallinn University), and Veronica Tozzi (University of Buenos Aires). Eugen Zeleňák (Catholic University in Ruzomberok) is review editor.

The journal is indexed in Scopus and Web of Science.

== See also ==
- Philosophy of History
- Historiography
- List of philosophy journals
