= Georg Iggers =

American historian (1926–2017)

Georg Gerson Iggers
- Born: December 7, 1926; Hamburg, Germany
- Died: November 26, 2017 (aged 90); Buffalo, New York, U.S.
- Occupation: Historian
- Spouse: Wilma Iggers

Georg Gerson Iggers (December 7, 1926 – November 26, 2017) was a German-born American historian of modern Europe, historiography, and European intellectual history.

== Life and career ==
Iggers was born in Hamburg, Germany, in 1926. Being a German Jew he fled Germany with his family to the U.S. in 1938, only few weeks before the Kristallnacht. Iggers belonged to the young émigrés from the Third Reich who later in life, as academic scholars in the United States, had a decisive impact on reviewing critically the history of Germany.

In 1957, Iggers became the first White brother initiated into Phi Beta Sigma, a historically Black fraternity.

He was visiting professor at the Technische Universität Darmstadt in 1991. He was Distinguished Professor Emeritus at the University at Buffalo and 2007 recipient of the First Class Cross of the Order of Merit of the Federal Republic of Germany. Iggers received the Humboldt Prize, honorary doctorate degrees from the University of Richmond, Technische Universität Darmstadt, and Philander Smith College, and fellowships from the American Philosophical Society, Fulbright Foundation, Guggenheim Foundation, National Endowment for the Humanities, and Rockefeller Foundation.

Iggars was especially noted for his writings on historiography.

== Death ==
Iggars died on November 26, 2017, of complications from a cerebral hemorrhage.

== Writings ==
Autobiography

- Georg G. Iggers, Wilma A. Iggers: Zwei Seiten der Geschichte. Lebensbericht aus unruhigen Zeiten. Vandenhoeck & Ruprecht, Göttingen 2002, ISBN 3-525-36265-X.
  - Two Lives in Uncertain Times. Facing the Challenges of the 20th Century as Scholars and Citizens. Berghahn, New York/ Oxford 2006, ISBN 1-84545-138-4.
- Georg G. Iggers: "History and Social Action beyond National and Continental Borders." In: Andreas W. Daum, Hartmut Lehmann, James J. Sheehan: The Second Generation. Émigrés from Nazi Germany as Historians. With a biobibliographical guide. Berghahn, New York 2016, ISBN 978-1-78238-985-9, 82–96.

Monographies

- The Cult of Authority. The Political Philosophy of the Saint-Simonians. A Chapter in the Intellectual History of Totalitarianism. Martinus Nijhoff, The Hague 1958.
- The German Conception of History. The National Tradition of Historical Thought from Herder to the Present. Wesleyan University Press, Middletown, Connecticut 1968.
  - (German translation: Deutsche Geschichtswissenschaft. Eine Kritik der traditionellen Geschichtsauffassung von Herder bis zur Gegenwart. dtv 1971)
- New Directions in European Historiography. With a contribution by Norman Baker. Wesleyan University Press, Middletown, Connecticut 1975.
  - German: Neue Geschichtswissenschaft. Vom Historismus zur historischen Sozialwissenschaft. Ein internationaler Vergleich. dtv 1978.
- Marxismus und Geschichtswissenschaft heute. Becker, Velten 1996, ISBN 3-89597-271-1.
- Geschichtswissenschaft im 20. Jahrhundert. Ein kritischer Überblick im internationalen Zusammenhang. Mit einem Nachwort. Vandenhoeck & Ruprecht 1993, ISBN 3-525-33587-3; 2nd ed. 1996.
  - Historiography in the Twentieth Century. From Scientific Objectivity to the Postmodern Challenge. Wesleyan University Press, Hanover, NH 1997, ISBN 0-8195-5302-6.
- Geschichtswissenschaft im 20. Jahrhundert. Ein kritischer Überblick im internationalen Zusammenhang. Neuausgabe, Vandenhoeck & Ruprecht 2007, ISBN 978-3-525-36149-8.
- with Q. Edward Wang and Supriya Mukherjee: A Global History of Modern Historiography. Routledge 2008 (2nd ed. 2017), ISBN 978-1-138-94227-1.

== See also ==
- Authoritarianism
- List of American historians
- List of Jewish American authors
- List of University at Buffalo people
