= Charles-Olivier Carbonell =

French historian (1930–2013)

Charles-Olivier Carbonell (20 June 1930 – 8 July 2013) was a French historian and historiographer who worked to put history as a profession on a sound scientific footing. He wrote numerous history books geared to secondary education, and devoted much of his work to establishing a field of European history.

== Career ==
Carbonell was an important figure in writing about the development of French historiography by pioneering historians of the 19th century. He broke out of narrow constraints of domestic narratives, and expanded his research to look at comparative history among different countries in Europe over a period of millennia, and inspired a group of young historians.

The generally accepted date for the development of French historiography is the 1870s (at the latest), but at the point, there was only one professional school for historians in France (Chartres) and it was turning out archivists, not historians. Only 10% of histories produced in the 1870s were by historians, and the majority were about antiquity; lawyers and journalists contributed. Carbonell did content analysis, showing the subjective views of writers of the period, for example referring to German soldiers as "barbarians", "butchers", "brigands". Ernst Lavisse described them as "voracious", "animal-like", "sweaty"; and similarly in books about the Paris Commune of 1871. In 1876, Gabriel Monod and established the Revue historique, supposedly the equivalent of the Historische Zeitschrift, a milestone in the establishment of the scientific tradition in French historiography, but in reality, it represented the views of a small, Protestant clique.

In the 1970s there was a reassessment by the nouvelle histoire group of historians including Carbonell leading to the Third Republic historians' work becoming an object of study. It was Carbonell's work Histoire est historiens, published in 1976, which saw the Third Republic as a period in which a new type of history writing in France arose, and so it is a response by the Protestant historians of the Third Republic who wrote history in a different way than Catholics did previously.

== Recognition ==
A book about Carbonell contributions to the profession appeared in 2002, entitled, "History(s), memory(s) and Europe: a passion for history: a tribute to Professor Charles-Olivier Carbonell".

== Personal life ==
Carbonell was born in Pézenas, France on 20 June 1930, and died in Montpellier, on 2 January 2013.

== Works ==
- Carbonell, Charles-Ollivier (April 1976). "La naissance de la Revue historique. Une revue de combat (1876-1885)" [The birth of the Revue historique. A journal of combat (1876–1885)]. Revue Historique (in French). 255 (518). PUF: 331–351. JSTOR 40953091.

== See also ==
- Nouvelle histoire

== Works cited ==
- "Charles-Olivier Carbonell (1930-2013) Hommage". Association des Professeurs d’Histoire et de Géographie (in French). 29 April 2013.
- Amalvi, Christian; Biloghi, Dominique, eds. (2002). Histoire(s), mémoire(s) et Europe: une passion de l'histoire : hommage au professeur Charles-Olivier Carbonell [History(s), memory(s) and Europe: a passion for history: a tribute to Professor Charles-Olivier Carbonell] (in French). Privat. ISBN 978-2-7089-5802-9. OCLC 216856615.
- Lukacs, John (1977). "Professional History As Myth [Review of Histoire et historiens. Une mutation idéologique des historiens français 1865-1885, by C.-O. Carbonell]". Salmagundi. 37: 155–160. JSTOR 40547080.
- Noronha-DiVanna, Isabel (19 February 2010). Writing History in the Third Republic. Cambridge Scholars Publishing. ISBN 978-1-4438-2010-3. OCLC 1162437900. preface is great for general historiog
