= Chocnějovice =

- Municipality
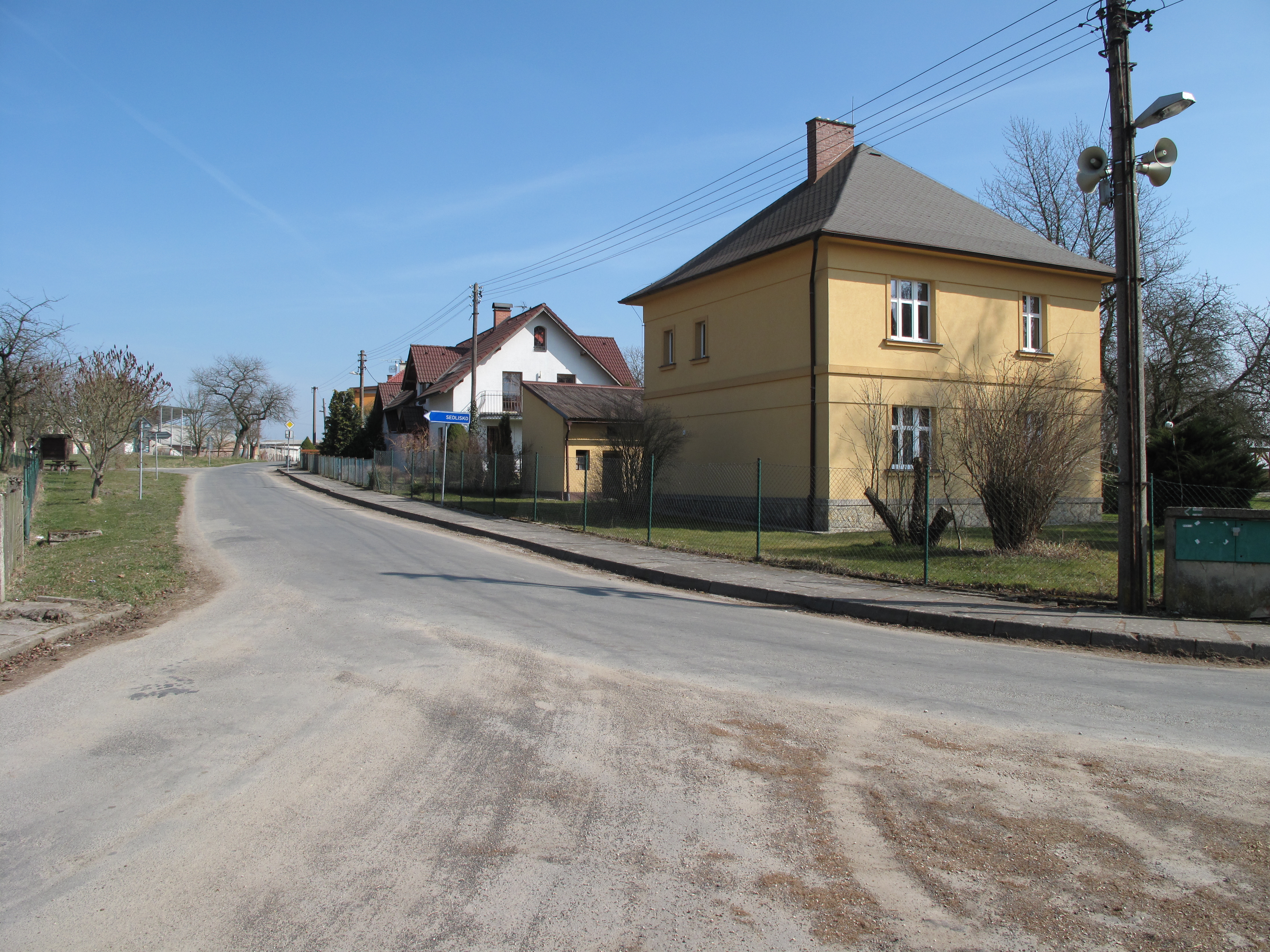
- Crossroads in the centre of Chocnějovice

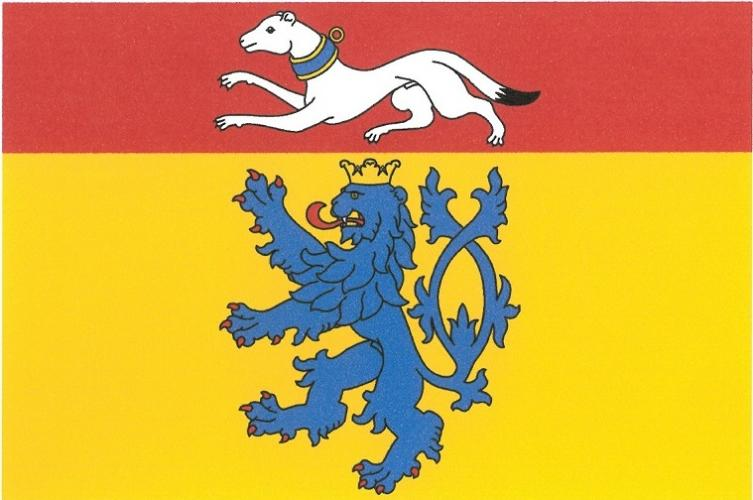
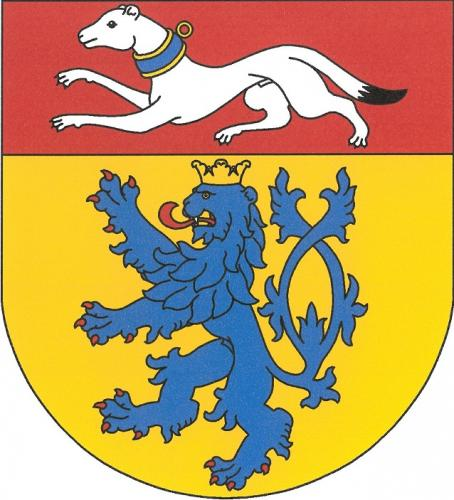
- Flag Coat of arms

- Location in the Czech Republic
- Coordinates: 50°34′37″N 14°58′17″E
- Country: Czech Republic
- Region: Central Bohemian
- District: Mladá Boleslav
- First mentioned: 1322

Area
  - Total: 13.34 km^{2} (5.15 sq mi)
- Elevation: 290 m (950 ft)

Population (2026-01-01)
  - Total: 431
  - Density: 32.3/km^{2} (83.7/sq mi)
- Time zone: UTC+1 (CET)
  - Summer (DST): UTC+2 (CEST)
- Postal code: 294 13
- Website: www.obecchocnejovice.eud.cz

Chocnějovice is a municipality and village in Mladá Boleslav District in the Central Bohemian Region of the Czech Republic. It has about 400 inhabitants.

== Administrative division ==
Chocnějovice consists of eight municipal parts (in brackets population according to the 2021 census):

- Chocnějovice (122)
- Buda (9)
- Buřínsko 1.díl (5)
- Buřínsko 2.díl (0)
- Drahotice (99)
- Ouč (44)
- Rostkov (29)
- Sovenice (128)

== Etymology ==
The name is derived from the personal name Chocněj, meaning "the village of Chocněj's people".

== Geography ==
Chocnějovice is located about 17 kilometres (11 mi) north of Mladá Boleslav and 19 km (12 mi) south of Liberec. It lies in the Jičín Uplands. The highest point is the hill Nadskalí at 390 m (1,280 ft) above sea level. The Mohelka River flows through the municipality. the Jizera River briefly flows along the southern municipal border.

== History ==
The first written mention of Chocnějovice is from 1322. From 1695 until the establishment of an independent municipality in 1850, the area was part of the Mnichovo Hradiště estate, owned by the Waldstein family.

== Demographics ==
Historical population

Year	Pop.	±%
1869	1,099	—
1880	1,152	+4.8%
1890	1,043	−9.5%
1900	1,143	+9.6%
1910	1,119	−2.1%

Year	Pop.	±%
1921	974	−13.0%
1930	948	−2.7%
1950	666	−29.7%
1961	663	−0.5%
1970	547	−17.5%

Year	Pop.	±%
1980	479	−12.4%
1991	417	−12.9%
2001	386	−7.4%
2011	383	−0.8%
2021	436	+13.8%

Source: Censuses

== Transport ==
There are no railways or major roads passing through the municipality.

== Sights ==
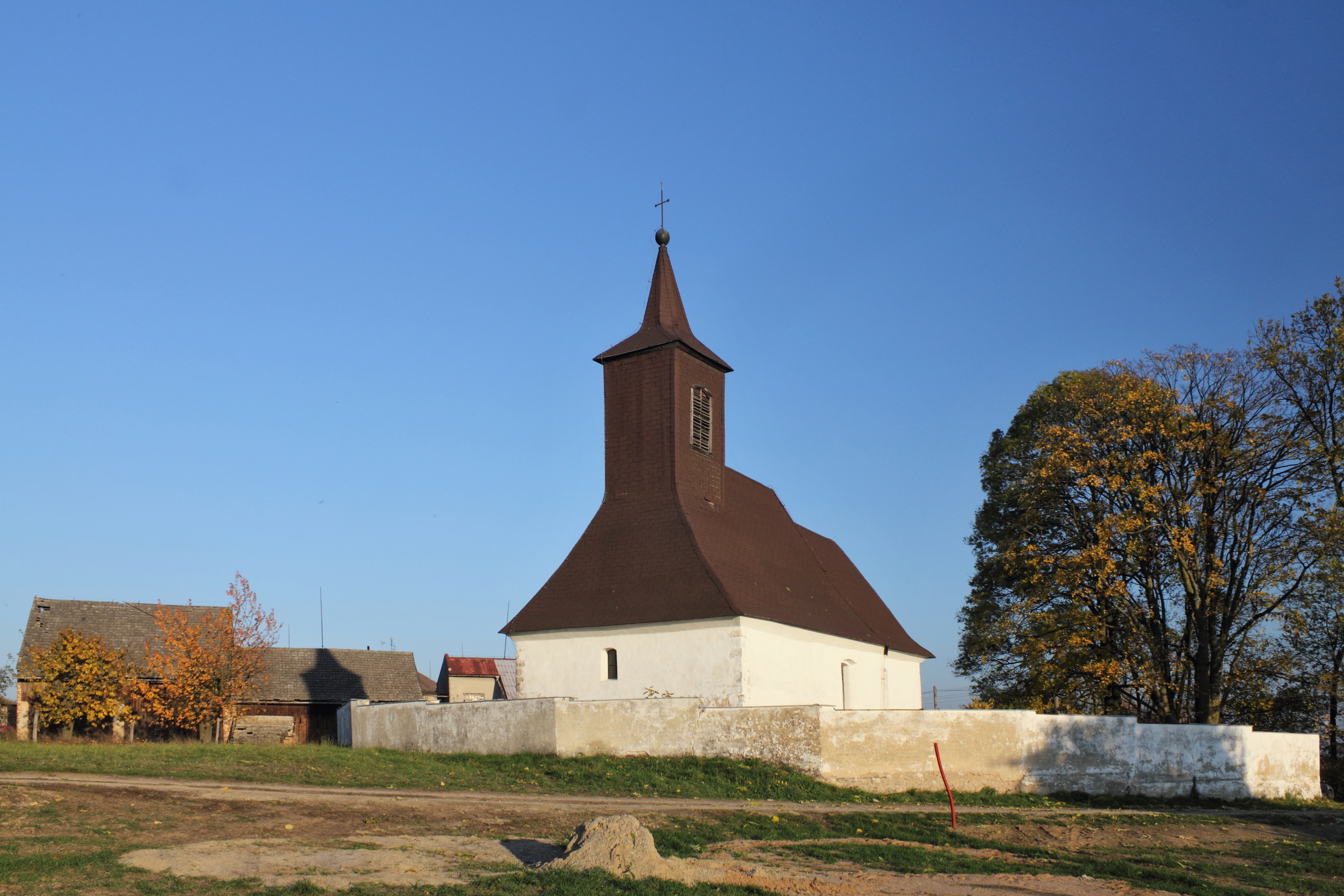
Church of Saint Gall

The main landmark of Chocnějovice is the Church of Saint Gall. It is a cemetery church, built in the Romanesque style in the 13th century. It s current form is a result of the modifications from the turn of the 19th and 20th centuries.

== Notable people ==
- Miloslav Rechcigl Sr. (1904–1973), politician
