= Frank Ankersmit =

Dutch historian and philosopher

Portrait of Frank Ankersmit

Franklin Rudolf Ankersmit (born 20 March 1945, Deventer, Netherlands) is a Dutch philosopher who is professor of intellectual history and historical theory at the University of Groningen.

Ankersmit, member of the family of textile manufacturers Ankersmit, initially studied physics and mathematics in Leiden for three years and then did his military service. He next studied both history and philosophy at the University of Groningen. In 1981 he took his doctoral degree at that same University with a dissertation entitled Narrative Logic: A Semantic Analysis of the Historian’s Language. In 1986 he was elected member of the Royal Netherlands Academy of Arts and Sciences (KNAW). He is founder and was until 2017 chief editor of the Journal of the Philosophy of History promoting a strictly philosophical approach to the reflection on the writing of history.

In 1992 he was appointed full professor for intellectual history and philosophy of history at the University of Groningen. His main interests, apart from philosophy of history, are political philosophy, aesthetics and the notion of historical experience (or sensation). The notion of representation is of central importance in his writings focusing on historical, political and aesthetic representation. He published fifteen books (edited books not included) of which many were translated into English, German, Spanish, Portuguese, Indonesian, Polish, Hungarian, Czech, Russian and Chinese. He wrote over two hundred-fifty scientific articles and is member of the editorial board of several journals in his fields of study. With his book on historical experience he won the Socrates challenge cup in 2008. He retired in 2010 and was appointed in that same year Officer in the Order of Orange-Nassau by H.M. the Queen of the Netherlands. In 2011 he was granted an Honorary Degree in the Humanities by the University of Ghent and in that same year he was appointed Member of the Academia Europaea (MAE).

== Philosophy of History ==
In the 1980s he developed a narrativist philosophy of history in which the order and coherence the historian gives to the facts of the past are said to be presented in, and with a historical ‘narrative’. In the 1990s he elaborated this idea into a philosophy of historical representation. According to this philosophy the historian does not ‘translate’ a meaning allegedly present in the past itself into the text of his representation, but he creates historical meaning in his representation of the past which can be seen as a substitute for the absent past itself. Since the word ‘narrative’ invites unwelcome associations with the novel, Ankersmit soon replaced it by the far more adequate word ‘representation’. This is where his philosophy of history basically differs from that of Hayden White. Ankersmit analyzed the notion of representation with Gottfried Wilhelm Leibniz's logic and metaphysics – no philosopher in the history of Western thought granted to representation a more central place than Leibniz. In his later work Ankersmit concentrates on the issue of historical rationality; his aim then is to establish on what rational grounds historians prefer one representation of the past to another. Leibniz is here his guide as well. Ankersmit is often perceived as a postmodernist, but his work can also be seen as drawing from the 19th century historian Friedrich Meinecke and as "an almost neo-Kantian desire to counter the hegemony of science in history and politics". In 2024 he published his life work: Franklin Rudolf Ankersmit, Representation: The Birth of Historical Reality from the Death of the Past (New York: Columbia University Press, 2024)

== Politics ==
Ankersmit was a member of the Dutch liberal party, the VVD (People's Party for Freedom and Democracy), and one of the authors of the Liberal Manifesto that this party presented. In 2009 he ended his membership of that party, since it had turned, in his view, from a liberal into a neoliberal party. He sees Neoliberalism as a return to Medieval feudalism: both wish to entrust public competences and responsibilities to (semi-)private hands. Whereas liberalism was born at the end of the 18th and the beginning of the 19th centuries from the rejection of feudalism. The Anglo-Saxon countries could forget about this, since they remained outside the grip of the French Revolution. Ankersmit was member of the National Convention, a commission installed by minister Alexander Pechtold in order to offer advice about how to strengthen democracy. More recently he insisted that representative democracy is, in fact, an elective aristocracy, which is, from a logical point of view, a peculiar mixture of Medieval political representation by the three Estates and the concept of sovereignty, as established under absolute monarchy. Ankersmit regularly participates at public debate on democracy, political representation, liberalism and related topics. In 2016 he became a member of the political party Forum for Democracy, but due to what he perceived as a lack of internal democracy of the party he became disappointed and left the party late 2017.

== Bibliography ==
- Narrative logic. A semantic analysis of the historian's language, Den Haag: Nijhoff, 1983.
- Denken over geschiedenis. Een overzicht van moderne geschiedfilosofische opvattingen, Groningen: Wolters/Noordhoff, 1983, 1986.
- The Reality Effect in the Writing of History: The Dynamics of Historiographical Topology, Amsterdam, Noord-Hollandsche, 1989.
- De navel van de geschiedenis. Over interpretatie, representatie en historische realiteit, Groningen: Historische Uitgeverij Groningen, 1990.
- De historische ervaring, Groningen: Historische Uitgeverij Groningen, 1993.
- with J.J.A. Mooij, Knowledge and Language. Vol.III. Metaphor and Language, Dordrecht, Reidel, 1993.
- History and Tropology. The Rise and Fall of Metaphor, Berkeley/Los Angeles/Oxford: University of California Press, 1994
- with Hans Kellner, A new Philosophy of History London, Aktion Books, 1995.
- De spiegel van het verleden. Exploraties deel I: Geschiedtheorie, Kampen, Kok Agora, 1996.
- De macht van representatie. Exploraties deel II: cultuurfilosofie en esthetica, Kampen: Kok Agora, 1996.
- Macht door representatie. Exploraties deel III: politieke filosofie, Kampen: Kok Agora 1997).
- Aesthetic politics. Political philosophy beyond fact and value, Stanford, Stanford/Cambridge UP, 1997.
- Historical Representation, Stanford: Stanford University Press, 2001
- Political Representation, Stanford: Stanford University Press, 2002
- Sublime Historical experience, Stanford/Cambridge 2005
- De Sublieme Historische Ervaring, Groningen, Historische Uitgeverij 2007.
- with Henk te Velde, Trust: Cement of Democracy?, Louvain, Louvain University Press, 2005
- Representational Democracy: An Aesthetic Approach to Conflict and Compromise, Common Knowledge 8.1 (2002) 24-46.
- with Ewa Domanska and Hans Kellner, Refiguring Hayden White, Stanford, Stanford University Press, 2009
- What if our representative democracies are elective aristocracies?, Redescriptions 15, 21 - 45
- Meaning, Truth and Reference in Historical Representation, Ithaca: Cornell University Press, 2012
- Sovereignty and Political Representation Redescriptions 2014
- Synecdochical and Metaphorical Political Representation: Then and Now in D. Castiglione and J. Pollak, Creating Political Presence, Chicago, University of Chicago Press 2019
- Tocqueville and Flaubert on 1848: the Sublimity of Revolution Graduate Faculty Philosophy Journal 2016 vol. 37: 253 - 273
- The Thorn of History: Unintended Consequences and Speculative Philosophy of History, History and Theory. Studies in the Philosophy of History. Volume 60, 187 - 215
- Representation: The Birth of Historical Reality from the Death of the Past, New York: Columbia University Press, 2024.
