= Czechoslovak Society of Arts and Sciences =

International non-profitable organization

Czechoslovak Society of Arts and Sciences, Inc.
- Abbreviation: SVU
- Predecessor: Czechoslovak Society of Arts and Sciences in America
- Formation: October 24, 1958; 67 years ago
- Founder: Jaroslav Němec
- Founded at: Washington, D.C.
- Tax ID no.: EIN #11-6035624
- Registration no.: 783908
- Headquarters: Washington, D.C.
- Website: www.svu2000.org

Czechoslovak Society of Arts and Sciences, known as Czechoslovak Society of Arts and Sciences in America until 1978, is an international non-profit organization with the aim to connect people with interest in Czech and Slovak intellectual contributions all around the world, supporting cooperation in culture, sciences, and education.

The society was founded in Washington DC in 1958 on the basis of the Washington DC local chapter of the Czechoslovak National Council of America (headquartered in Chicago), by Dr. Jaroslav Němec, a lawyer and exiled chief military prosecutor, with significant support from Vlasta Vraz, president of the Czechoslovak National Council of America.

In the years 1961–1978, the society was registered as Czechoslovak Society of Arts and Sciences in America in the New York State. In November 1978, the society's head office was incorporated in the nation's capital Washington DC, where it was incepted. In November 1978, also the society's official name was changed - it was shortened to Czechoslovak Society of Arts and Sciences, to reflect its international character and new local chapters being created also outside of the United States.

All operations of this organization are carried out by unpaid volunteers. From its inception, the society has been independent and non-partisan.

== Founding personalities ==
Jaroslav Němec convinced world-renowned mathematician Václav Hlavatý to become the first president of the society. Němec became its first secretary general. In the years 1968–1970, Němec served as the society's president and in 1980–1985, he also edited the society's newsletter SVU NEWS / ZPRÁVY SVU.

In the beginning, Němec was also able to get support for the project of creating this Society among known artists and writers: Jarmila Novotná, Rafael Kubelík, Rudolf Firkušný, Ladislav Radimský, and others. Among politicians, he got Ladislav Feierabend, Juraj Slávik, Jozef Lettrich, Arnošt Heidrich, Štefan Osuský. Among the founding members there were also Joseph Hašek (father of Eliska Haskova Coolidge) and Francis Schwarzenberg.

== Society's periodicals ==
The society publishes a quarterly newsletter SVU NEWS/ ZPRÁVY, and an English scholarly journal KOSMAS.

During the communist era in Czechoslovakia, the society published a Czech language and Slovak language literary and humanistic periodical: PROMĚNY - PREMENY/ METAMORPHOSES for nearly thirty years, which included articles by forbidden authors.

== Conferences ==
The society held its First World Congress in Washington, D.C. in 1962. Since then, every even year, the society has convened a world congress. The program includes presentations of scholarly papers, discussion panels, concerts, artistic exhibits and social events. The society has established the practice of convening specialized conferences every other year, usually in between the World Congresses.

== See also ==
- Václav Hlavatý
