= List of homelessness organizations =

This is a list of notable organizations that provide services or work on issues related to homelessness.

== A–B ==
- 100,000 Homes Campaign, a US program with the mission of placing 100,000 chronically homeless people in stable housing.
- Abahlali baseMjondolo, a popular, entirely non-professionalized and democratic mass movement of shack dwellers and other poor people in South Africa
- Acting for Life
- Ali Forney Center
- Anti-Poverty Committee, an organisation based in Vancouver, British Columbia, that campaigns against poverty and homelessness
- Back on My Feet, an American urban homeless outreach organization based in Philadelphia, Pennsylvania, centered on overcoming homelessness through running
- Barefoot Foundation
- Barnabus Manchester
- The Big Issue Foundation
- Bill Wilson Center
- The Booth Centre
- The Bowery Mission
- Breaking Ground
- Breaktime

Top of page

== C–D ==
- Caretakers Cottage
- Carrfour Supportive Housing, established in 1993 to end homelessness in Miami, Florida
- Casa Alianza, a charity and NGO whose aims are the rehabilitation and the defence of street children in Guatemala, Honduras, Mexico, and Nicaragua
- Catching Lives
- Catharsis (organization)
- Catholic Charities
- Centrepoint (charity)
- Church penitentiary
- Citizens for Public Justice
- Coalition on Homelessness, a homeless advocacy and social justice organization that focuses on creating long-term solutions to homelessness, poverty, and housing issues in San Francisco, California
- Coast Shelter
- Common Ground (Seattle)
- Community of Sant'Egidio
- Compass Family Services
- Covenant House
- Crisis (charity)
- Dans la Rue
- Detour House
- Dignity Village
- Dome Village
- Downtown Emergency Service Center

Top of page

== E–F ==
- Emmaus (charity)
- Empowerment Plan
- Empty Homes Agency
- Family Promise
- FareStart
- FEANTSA, the only major European network that focuses exclusively on homelessness at European level and receives financial support from the European Commission for the implementation of its activities
- First Step Back Home
- Florence House
- Freight Train Riders of America
- Frontline Foundation

Top of page

== G–I ==
- HabiJax
- Habitat for Humanity
- HomeAid
- HomeGround Services
- Homeless Workers' Movement, an urban social movement that fights for low-income housing rights in Brazil
- Homes for the Homeless
- Homes Not Jails
- HOPE Atlanta
- Horizon House
- Hospitality House
- Hotel de Gink
- Huckleberry House
- I Have A Name Project
- Interagency Council on Homelessness, a US federal program and office created by the McKinney-Vento Homeless Assistance Act of 1986
- International Brotherhood Welfare Association
- Invisible People, Invisible People is an American 501(c)(3) non-profit organization working for homeless people in the United States.[1] The organization educates the public about homelessness through storytelling, educational resources, and advocacy.

Top of page

== J–L ==
- Jesuit Volunteer Corps
- Joe Hill House
- Karluk Manor
- LAMP Community
- Lighthouse Wien

Top of page

== M-N ==
- Mad Housers
- Manila Reception and Action Center
- Midnight Mission :P
- Milwaukee Normal School-Milwaukee Girls' Trade and Technical High School
- Mission Australia
- Mobilise
- Museum of Homelessness
- Najidah (Australia)
- National Alliance to End Homelessness, a nonprofit organization that promotes measures to end homelessness in the United States
- National Coalition for Homeless Veterans
- The National Law Center on Homelessness and Poverty
- New York City Department of Homeless Services
- Notting Hill Housing Trust

Top of page

== O–P ==
- Old Brewery Mission
- Ontario Coalition Against Poverty
- Operation Safety Net
- Outside In (organization)
- Ozone House
- Pacific Garden Mission
- Palladia (social services organization)
- The Passage (charity)
- Pathways to Housing, a not-for-profit organization whose goal is to provide housing for the mentally-challenged homeless of New York City
- Peachtree-Pine shelter
- Poor People's Alliance
- Poverello Center
- Project Compass
- Project HOME
- Projects for Assistance in Transition from Homelessness

Top of page

== Q–R ==
- Quarriers
- Raphael House
- Restaurants du Cœur
- Revolutionary Housing League housing activist and direct action group in Ireland
- Rosie's Place, a sanctuary for poor and homeless women located in Boston, Massachusetts
- Rough Sleepers Initiative
- Rowton Houses
- Ruth Ellis Center

Top of page

== S ==
- Safe Horizon
- Saint Francis House, a daytime shelter for the homeless and poor in downtown Boston, Massachusetts
- Saint Joseph's House of Hospitality (Pittsburgh)
- Salvation Army
- SAMU Social, a municipal emergency service in several cities in France whose purpose is to provide care and medical aid to homeless people
- San Antonio Housing Authority
- Sanyukai, an NGO operating in the San'ya district in Tokyo, Japan which offers free services to the homeless
- The Scott Mission
- Seaton House
- Seattle Youth Garden Works
- Second Harvest Toronto
- Second Presbyterian Church (Chattanooga, Tennessee)
- Self-Master Colony
- Shelter (charity), a registered charity that campaigns to end homelessness and bad housing in England and Scotland
- Shelterhouse
- Sheltersuit Foundation
- The Shoebox Project for Shelters
- So Others Might Eat
- The Society for the Relief of the Homeless Poor
- Society of St James
- South Park Inn
- Southern Youth and Family Services
- St Mungo's (charity)
- St Patrick's Church, Hove
- St. Anthony Foundation
- St. Paul's Episcopal Church (Chattanooga, Tennessee)
- StandUp for Kids
- Street Medicine Institute
- Street Outreach Program
- Streetlife (charity)
- Sulzbacher Center
- Supportive Services for Veteran Families (SSVF)

Top of page

== T–U ==
- Take Back the Land
- Taldumande Youth Services
- TECHO
- Tent City 4
- Thames Reach
- Tipping Point Community
- Toronto House of Industry
- Transitional Living for Older Homeless Youth
- United States Interagency Council on Homelessness

Top of page

== W–Z ==
- Veterans Aid
- Veterans Transition Center
- Veterans Inc.
- Washington Legal Clinic for the Homeless
- Wayside Chapel
- Weingart Center for the Homeless
- Welsh Presbyterian Church (Columbus, Ohio)
- Western Cape Anti-Eviction Campaign, a South African social movement struggling against evictions and other causes of homelessness
- Wild Goose Café
- Wintringham Specialist Aged Care
- Yfoundations
- Youth Off The Streets

== See also ==
- List of tent cities in the United States
