= Youth Collaboratory =

Youth-services nonprofit in the US

- Formation: 1988
- Type: Nonprofit
- Purpose: Youth services, youth homelessness, human trafficking prevention, youth mentoring
- Headquarters: Pittsburgh, Pennsylvania, U.S.
- Executive Director: Megan Blondin
- Main organ: Board of Directors
- Website: youthcollaboratory.org
- Formerly called: Mid-Atlantic Network of Youth and Family Services, Inc. (MANY)

Youth Collaboratory is a nonprofit membership organization based in Pittsburgh, Pennsylvania, that provides training, technical assistance, and capacity-building services to youth-serving organizations in the United States in the areas of youth homelessness, human trafficking prevention, and youth mentoring. It originated as a collaborative network of service providers and continues to support coordination and knowledge-sharing across the youth-serving sector.

Youth Collaboratory operates the Runaway and Homeless Youth Training, Technical Assistance, and Capacity Building Center (RHYTTAC) under a cooperative agreement with the Family and Youth Services Bureau (FYSB) of the U.S. Department of Health and Human Services (HHS). RHYTTAC serves as the training and technical assistance provider for all federally-funded Runaway and Homeless Youth (RHY) Program grantees nationwide.

== History ==
Youth Collaboratory was founded in 1988 as the Mid-Atlantic Network of Youth and Family Services, Inc. (MANY) to coordinate services between youth-serving member organizations in the Mid-Atlantic region. It has since grown to a membership organization working with youth-serving organizations throughout the United States.

In November 2018, the organization adopted the name Youth Collaboratory.

== Programs and services ==
Youth Collaboratory provides training, technical assistance, and capacity-building services to nonprofit and public agencies working with youth populations. Its work includes support for programs addressing youth homelessness, human trafficking, and youth mentoring. The organization developed Mentoring+, a one-on-one community-based mentoring program model established in 2005 for youth ages 6–17 at risk of juvenile justice involvement. The model is designed for implementation by member organizations and is aligned with the Elements of Effective Practice for Mentoring standards.

Through RHYTTAC, Youth Collaboratory develops and delivers training, facilitates peer learning, and supports implementation of best practices for federally funded runaway and homeless youth programs. RHYTTAC also coordinates the annual national training for all federal RHY grantees.

The organization also receives funding from the Department of Justice's Office of Juvenile Justice and Delinquency Prevention (OJJDP) to provide training and technical assistance to organizations serving young victims of commercial sexual exploitation and domestic sex trafficking.

== Recognition ==
In 2024, Youth Collaboratory received the Pembrook Award for Survivor Inclusion from Freedom Network USA, recognizing demonstrated commitment to survivor inclusion in anti-trafficking work.

Joy Thompson, director of programs at Youth Collaboratory, serves on the National Advisory Committee on the Trafficking of Children and Youth in the United States, a federal advisory committee under the Administration for Children and Families.
