= Anti-homelessness =

Anti-homelessness may refer to:

- Attempts to help homeless people overcome the problem of homelessness
- Discrimination against the homeless
- Anti-homelessness legislation, which includes both legislation intended to support and rehouse the homeless and legislation that criminalizes the homeless
- For anti-homelessness organizations, see List of organizations opposing homelessness
