= Safety net (disambiguation) =

A safety net is a net that protects people who fall from height.

Safety net may also refer to:

- "Safety Net", a 1986 single by Shop Assistants
- Safety net hospital, a U.S. hospital type that provides healthcare regardless of insurance status
- SafetyNET p, a standard for Ethernet-based fieldbus communication
- Safety Net Records, a record label founded by Bill Ashton
- The Safety Net, a 1970 novel by Heinrich Böll
- Operation Safety Net, a Street Medicine program in Pittsburgh, Pennsylvania
- Social safety net, a collection of anti-poverty services provided by the state
- SafetyNet API, a security mechanism in Google Play Services
