= Runaway and Homeless Youth Act =

US bill for federal definition of homeless youth

The Runaway and Homeless Youth Act (RHYA, originally the Runaway Youth Act) is a US law originally passed in 1974 as Title III of the Juvenile Justice and Delinquency Prevention Act. The bill sets the federal definition of homeless youth, and forms the basis for the Runaway and Homeless Youth Program, administered by the Family and Youth Services Bureau. It has been reauthorized multiple times, and is due for re-authorization as of March 2018.

== Definition of homeless youth ==
The RYHA forms the basis of the federal government's definition of homeless youth, as a person who is:

not more than 21 years of age ... for whom it is not possible to live in a safe environment with a relative and who have no other safe alternative living arrangement.

== Runaway and Homeless Youth Program ==
It provides federal funding in the amount of $115 million per year as of 2014, for emergency shelters and other services throughout the country targeted at young adults and adolescents who have run away or are homeless. This funding forms the basis of the Runaway and Homeless Youth Program administered by the Family and Youth Services Bureau of the Department of Health and Human Services. The program provides services in three areas: the Basic Centre Programme, the Transitional Living Programme, and the Street Outreach Programme.

== Legislative history ==
The RYHA was originally passed as the Runaway Youth Act. Provisions for "otherwise homeless youth" were later added in 1977, and the name was officially changed in 1980. The bill was reauthorized in 2008, a version which increased funding for basic center programs to an annual $150 million, and street outreach programs at $30 million; required the Department of Health and Human Services to develop national estimates of the prevalence of homelessness among the youth population; increased the permitted length individuals may stay in shelters or temporary housing to 21 from 14 days; required performance standards for all programs; and required that programs utilize a positive youth development perspective.

Additional funding was allocated in 2016, and on March 20, 2018 a bill was introduced by Kentucky Representative John Yarmuth for re-authorization. As of 2014 the bill has been amended a total of nine times.

== See also ==
- Anti-homelessness legislation
- Homelessness among LGBT youth in the United States
- Homelessness in the United States
- List of homelessness organizations
- Transitional Living for Older Homeless Youth
