= Ronald James Ward =

American serial killer (1966–2014)

- Born: Ronald James Ward, Jr. 1966; Hood River, Oregon, U.S.
- Died: April 11, 2014 (aged 47–48); Montana State Prison, Deer Lodge, Montana, U.S.
- Conviction: Deliberate homicide
- Penalty: 100 years imprisonment

Details
- Victims: 4+
- Span of crimes: August – December 2000
- Country: United States
- States: Arkansas, Montana, California
- Date apprehended: January 2001

Ronald James Ward Jr. (1966 – April 11, 2014) was an American serial killer who murdered at least three women and one man in the span of several months in 2000. Initially convicted for the murder of Craig Petrich in Montana, he was later linked by DNA evidence to three other murders, which had occurred in Arkansas and California. Ward died serving his sentence in the Montana State Prison in 2014, but the cause of his death was not disclosed.

== Early life ==
Ward was born in Hood River, Oregon, but was raised in the areas of Eugene and Springfield. When Ward was 19 his father, Ronald Sr., an abusive womanizer, divorced his wife, whom he had given syphilis. Ward claimed he had had eight stepmothers while growing up, and that he quit school in the sixth grade. At age 19, he married a woman named Donna, who herself had six children.

He was a kind father to his adoptive children, taking them out on family walks and other activities he himself hadn't partaken in with his own father. At some point, he held a job as a football coach for the 7th and 8th grades in Coos Bay.

Married life didn't suit either Ronald or Donna, with the added trouble that Ronald was also doing heavy drugs at the time. She eventually moved away to Arkansas, with Ward losing all contact with his stepchildren. His drug habits eventually cost him the ability to hold a regular job, as he hurt his head during a fight in Oregon. To make ends meet, Ward began working odd jobs as a truck driver, homebuilder and a commercial fisherman, which he enjoyed doing.

After spending some time on a boat in Alaska for fishing season, Ronald met Hattie Ann Baker at the Poverello Center in Missoula, Montana, in 1999. Baker was an impoverished divorcee with three children, whose husband Henry had left her to fend for herself. The couple then moved to West Virginia so Baker could be with relatives, and Ward started driving a garbage truck.

== Murders ==
=== Kristin Laurite ===
The 25-year-old Kristin Laurite, from Scotch Plains, New Jersey, left her home for Eureka, California, as she planned to take a job at a daycare in the city. On August 25, 2000, Laurite stopped her 1972 Volkswagen van along a secluded Interstate 40 rest stop outside of Morrilton, Arkansas so she could splash some water on her face and let her two dogs run down to a nearby pond and play. The following day, truckers found one of Laurite's dogs running loose and called the number on the dog tag, which got them in contact with Laurite's mother, Lynn DiBenedetto. The dogs later led authorities from the Arkansas Highway Patrol to Laurite's body, which was dumped behind the rest stop. Her sundress had been tossed aside, and it was evident that Laurite had been sexually assaulted before suffering at least 10 stab wounds to the neck.

A short while before the killing, Ward had found his girlfriend with another man. Shocked, he quickly stormed off to his garbage truck, claiming that he would drive to Montana so he could find his mother. He brought with him five jugs with moonshine, cocaine and heroin, and while en route to Montana, the highly intoxicated Ward simply chanced upon Laurite, whom he proceeded to beat, strangle, rape and finally stab to death.

=== Craig Petrich ===
Eventually, Ward and Baker moved to Montana, settling in an RV park in Hamilton. There Ward met 43-year-old Craig Sheldon Petrich, who was selling his motor home. Shortly after that, in October, Petrich disappeared suddenly. Two weeks later, his bullet-riddled body was found in the Soft Rock recreational area in the Sapphire Mountains. Authorities quickly connected the dots and went after Ward, who by then had fled the state along with Baker.

According to Ward, after a night of bingedrinking in the trailer, Petrich had assaulted Baker. After returning the next morning, the enraged Ward grabbed a gun, which he had acquired from a friend in Hamilton, and shot Petrich on the spot. However, authorities had a different version of events: it's likely that Ward and Petrich had left the RV park together in the afternoon, heading out to the Sapphire Mountains. There, the two men got into a fight, with Ward managing to beat Petrich with a rock before shooting him thrice in the chest. After that, he hid his body in a rock crevice.

=== Jackie Travis ===
A 49-year-old from Jonesboro, Arkansas, Jacqueline Faye Travis, who had a prosthetic leg as a result from a car accident, had just recently moved to Merced, California, after a period of being homeless. It is thought they knew each other from a local homeless shelter. Less than a month later, Travis was found beaten, raped, strangled, carved on, burnt, stabbed and sexually assaulted in her apartment, which Ward allegedly frequented, on December 7, in an eerily similar fashion to the Arkansas and Modesto killings.

=== Shela Polly ===
A 32-year-old homeless divorcee with three children, Shela Polly was taking exams in Las Vegas to become a nursing assistant. She had planned to return to her home in Modesto, California, where she would share custody with her former husband, Tim Polly. Most details regarding her murder are kept secret, it is known that she was beaten, stabbed and sexually assaulted, with her body then dumped and covered with leaves in Modesto's Dry Creek in December 2000. Witnesses claimed that they had seen Polly accompanied by Ward sometime before her murder.

== Investigation, trial and death ==
After fleeing Montana, Ward was arrested three months later in Merced in connection with Polly's murder. He was extradited back to Montana, where he was tried for the Petrich murder, to which he readily confessed. Ward would not be conclusively connected to the other murders until 2007, when he was linked by DNA to the Laurite killing. Until then, her family had searched for answers, putting up a billboard on the highway with Laurite's image with the plea "Do you know who murdered me?".

Ward was extradited to Arkansas, where he pleaded nolo contendere to the murder, when he initially planned to plead guilty. He explained that he had no recollection of killing Laurite, but still believed that he was guilty, citing the DNA evidence as conclusive proof. He was given another life sentence for this murder.

Not long after, that same DNA evidence connected him with the Polly and Travis murders in California, which also fit his modus operandi. John E. Douglas, the famous FBI profiler, dismissed Ward's claim of being a nonviolent person, pointing out that serial killers often blamed things like drug abuse for their actions, while secretly treasuring their crimes in their minds. He and Det. Ray Sterling pointed out that these most likely weren't Ward's only murders, as he had travelled cross-country.

On April 11, 2014, Ronald James Ward was found unresponsive in his high-security cell. He was transported to the hospital, where he was pronounced dead. Medical personnel did not report the exact cause of death, but said that no foul play was involved in his death.

== See also ==
- List of serial killers in the United States
