= Ozone House =

Nonprofit organization

Www.ozonehouse.org

Ozone House, based in Ann Arbor, Michigan, is a 501(c)(3) non-profit organization that works to "meet the needs of runaway, homeless, and high-risk youth and their families." Ozone House addresses these objectives through a variety of services and venues, including a 24-hour youth crisis hotline, emergency youth shelter, transitional living programs, a drop-in center, and street outreach. It is a state-licensed Child Caring Institution and a Substance Abuse Prevention provider. Ozone Houses offers support throughout the state of Michigan, but is focused more directly in the surrounding Washtenaw County area. The organization takes its name from the Commander Cody and His Lost Planet Airmen song "Lost in the Ozone", owing to its roots as a drug-counseling program. Historically, it is among the first-generation alternative service providers that emerged in the 1960s dealing with runaways and the needs of at-risk youth.

== History ==
The organization began in 1969 in Ann Arbor in response to the growing number of runaway youth migrating to "hip" towns following the Summer of Love of 1967. During this time, Ann Arbor was among the top 20 cities in the U.S. with a high influx of runaways. Many came to experience the counter culture of the '70s but would later find themselves stranded. Graduates and students of the University of Michigan, local businesses, organizations, and community residents united in support of Ozone House in order to handle the increasing number of street-dwelling and panhandling runaways. Most traditional agencies and police departments did not believe the stories of runaways: tales of harrowing physical, sexual, and psychological abuse. As a "counter culture" organization, Ozone House adopted a collectivist system to make its organizational decisions.

Ozone House was part of four main agencies in the Community Center Coordinating Council (referred to as C4) that provided services to youth who did not qualify for human resources services at the time or who did not feel comfortable engaging those established human resource organizations. Originally housed together with these other services, Ozone House relocated several times since its founding. However, unlike the other C4 agencies, Ozone House is the only one that remains autonomous and active to this day.

=== Response to youth runaway needs ===
While initially providing drug-counseling to runaway youth, the organization expanded its services in the early 1970s to provide safe, temporary housing ("crash pads") for youth, many of whom found themselves in Ann Arbor with no means of returning home. Many staff at Ozone House were college "dropouts" who recognized the need to establish trust between their clients, and in keeping with the times and lack of funds, provided physical spaces that were "non-institutional" and casual.

As the runaway crisis drew larger legal attention, issues arose concerning underage runaways and their parents. One of its earliest approaches was a three-tiered system for housing youth summarized as "crashing, fostering, and moling", each targeting a specific situation and age of the youth. "Crashing" involved youths over age 17 who did not need parental consent and could be housed by listed individuals or families in the area. "Fostering" was used in conjunction with Catholic Social Services of Michigan in order to circumvent state-licensing issues and arrangeded for youth to live in state-licensed foster homes. Many of these new foster homes offered alternatives to traditional "foster parents" by accepting young homosexuals, the "streetwise" and sexually active. If such a foster home was available, the system utilized parental consent and asked for a voluntary small financial contribution to assist with the child's living expenses. The situation was unique because it allowed the youth to initiate hir services, rather than the parents or the state. The final strategy, "moling", recognized situations in which "a young person cannot get parental permission for Foster Care, the young person refuses to contact his/her parents, is an institutional runaway, or in other special circumstances." This third system allowed an underage youth to be sheltered regardless of the legal policies at the time. Counselors would ask a series of questions to determine if moling was the last (and most appropriate) option and if the actions could be justified pending legal action. "Moling" was recognized as a risky alternative requiring caution and staff were adamant that they be used solely for crisis situations rather than casual escapes from a youth's personal or familial problems. Staff viewed the third option as maintaining solidarity with the radical political changes in youth advocacy.

While helping to lead national advocacy to expand youth legal rights, Ozone House became the second agency of its kind to receive federal funding to address the growing needs of youth. This led to expanded services, such a free counseling, family intervention, and individual youth advocacy.

=== Changes ===
By the mid-1970s, Ozone House began recognizing that the problems youth faced were rapidly changing. Among these were rising incidence rates of child abuse, substance abuse problems within families, poverty, and parental imprisonment. Likewise, runaways who left home to explore counter culture on their own were becoming replaced by youth who had been thrown out of their homes ("throwaways") and youth who had aged out of the foster care system and found themselves with nowhere to go.

To address these needs, Ozone began changing its structure, including phasing out its collectivist decision-making system with a more traditional board of directors. The collective system was officially dropped in 1995. Professional, degreed staff were hired to ensure their ability to handle the social, demographic, and federal aspects of youth advocacy and assistance. Ozone House also began an aggressive grant-writing campaign, acknowledging that competing for federal funding was becoming a reality for non-profits like themselves. Federal funding would also establish them as a legitimate service organization in the community and allow them to try "diversified models of delivering services to youth."

Ozone House staff and directors acknowledged that police and legal institutions were more comfortable and accepting with their approach toward at-risk youth. A board of directors' meeting in 1974 noted that "[Ozone House] can't drift back underground after developing legitimacy in the community."

In 1984, Ozone House expanded its services by adding "Miller House", a transitional living program. There homeless youth could receive free room and board while attending school, working, and developing independent-living skills. Services continue to be added in the present day.

== Services ==
Ozone House offers several services to address the needs of youth and families through its main site in Ann Arbor and the Drop-In Center in Ypsilanti.

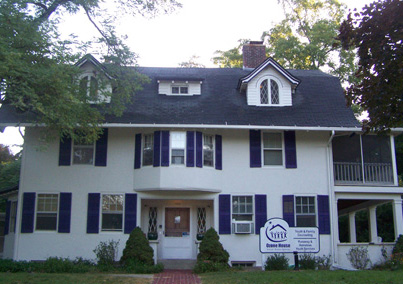
Ozone House's Main Site in Ann Arbor, Michigan

Main Site:

- Emergency three-week youth shelter for youth ages 10 – 17.
- 24-hour Crisis Line.
- Individual, group, and family counseling services.
- Case management and advocacy for youth ages 16 – 21.
- "Miller House" and "SOLO" (Supported Opportunities for Living on your Own) transitional and independent living programs for youth ages 17 – 21.

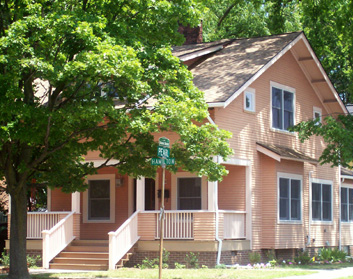
Ozone House's Drop-In Center in Ypsilanti, Michigan

Ypsilanti Drop-In Center Site:

- After-school youth center.
- Street Outreach Program.
- Youth Making an Impact (YMI), Ozone-organized youth volunteer group.
- PrideZone, weekly LGBTQ youth safe space.
- WorkZone, job training and internship program.
- Project SpeakOUT, youth creative writing expression program.
- Community Education and Outreach team.

Ozone House is composed of a board of directors as well as administrative, clinical, residential, and part-time staff and volunteers.

== Partnerships, affiliations, and funding ==
Ozone House is partnered with various community organizations, including the University of Michigan School of Nursing Nurse Managed Centers, Family Support Network, and Communities Empowering Youth.

The organization's various funders include the Washtenaw Coordinated Funders, the Arcus Foundation Gay & Lesbian Fund, the City of Ann Arbor, and the Salvation Army.

== Awards and recognition ==
Ozone House was recognized as a finalist at the University of Michigan's annual Positive Business Conference in 2015. Selected as Top 10 Finalist in the University of Michigan Stephen M.Ross School of Business' Positive Business Project, which recognizes agencies whose business practices make a positive difference in the world while driving great bottom-line outcomes, 2015. Awarded grant funding as lead agency for Communities Empowering Youth, a new collaborative effort among eight Ypsilanti-based agencies to evaluate and enhance capacity to provide positive youth development opportunities for high-risk youth in Ypsilanti in 2006.

Ozone House was awarded the "Best Managed Nonprofit in Southeastern Michigan" by Crain's Detroit Business in 2002. Other awards and recognition include "Exemplary Agency for use of Best Practices" by a Michigan State University study, "Best Practices in Transitional and Independent Living Services" by the National Resource Center in 2002, and three-time honors by the Nonprofit Enterprises at Work (NEW) Center for Nonprofit Management Excellence.

The University of Michigan's Bentley Historical Library established and maintains finding aids for Ozone House records. It was created by the Michigan Historical Collections staff.
