= 24-hour fort challenge =

Internet challenge in which participants trespass in closed venues

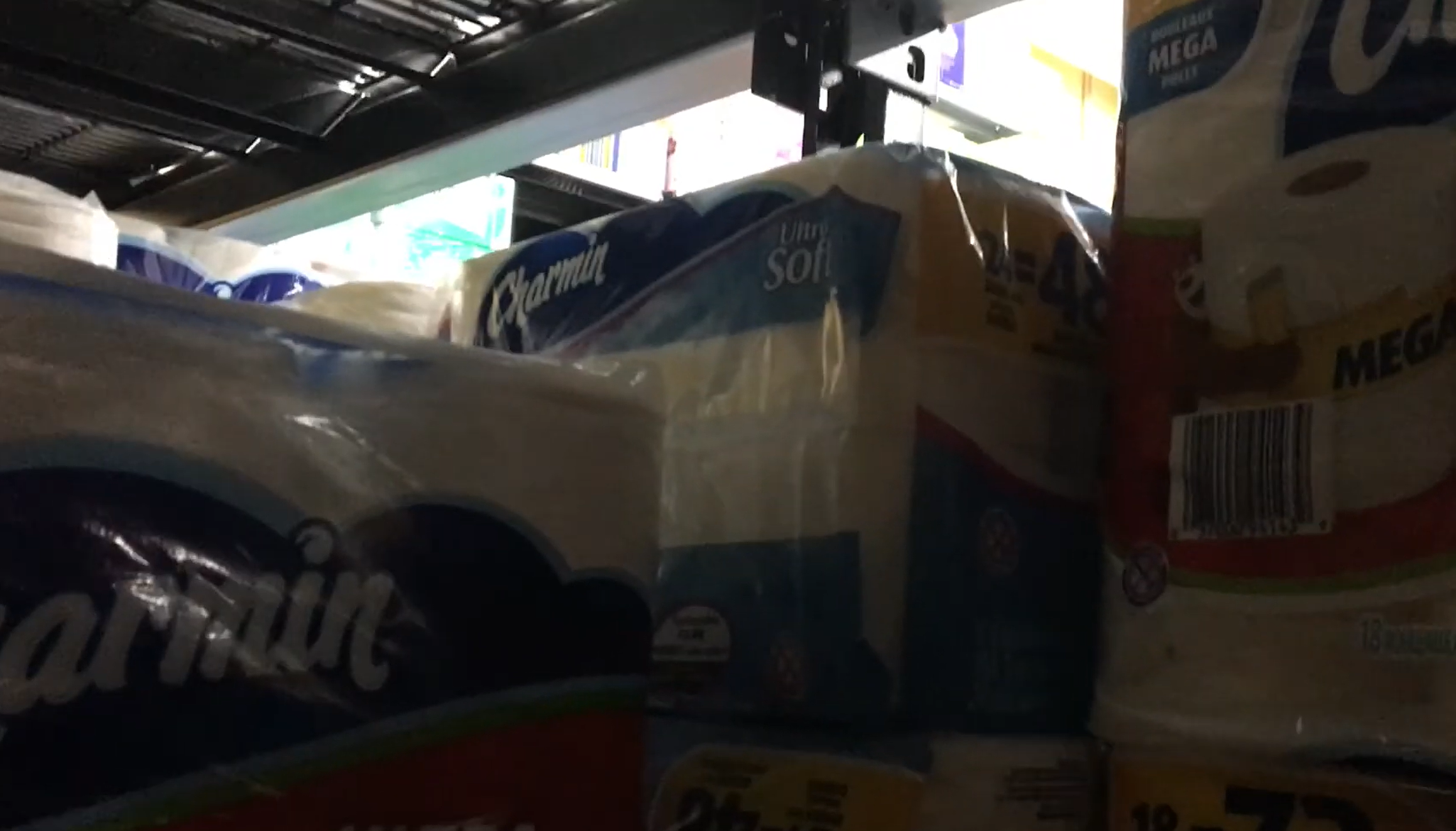
A view from the interior of a fort constructed out of packaged toilet paper rolls, built inside a Walmart branch.

The 24-hour fort challenge, also known as the 24-hour challenge or Overnight challenge, is a challenge which originated in 2016 and reached the peak of its popularity in 2018. During the challenge, participants must reach a location or venue before it closes for the evening and trespass on the property by hiding in a "fort". These forts are normally a quickly constructed hiding place made by moving products on shelves in such a way that the participants can hide behind them, although some participants have carried out the challenge simply by hiding in areas such as public toilets and staff-only areas. In the case of venues which stay open 24 hours a day, such as larger supermarkets and stores, an alternative goal is to simply stay within the building for as long as possible without being caught.

While the challenge's name implies that participants are to stay at their chosen location for a full day (24 hours), most videos of the challenge simply have those taking part attempt to remain in the building until morning. Once the location closes, the goal is to remain in the venue for as long as possible before the location reopens in the morning, or until the building's staff or security apprehend the participants. Several store chains and companies have spoken out against the challenge, and participants risk being banned from stores or facing criminal charges for trespassing, criminal damage and breaking and entering.

Examples of people hiding and living in stores for extended periods of time precede the challenge. In 2014, a 14-year-old runaway lived inside a Texas Walmart branch for two days, consuming shoplifted food and changing his clothes to avoid detection while living inside a hiding place he set up behind boxed merchandise in the store's baby care section; he was apprehended and returned to his family after an employee noticed him and informed law enforcement.

== See also ==
- Urban exploration
