= Transitional Living for Older Homeless Youth =

In the United States, Transitional Living Programs usually refer to programs and efforts to teach independent living skills to homeless youth and help them transition to adulthood. The United States government supports a grant program to fund such efforts.

The Transitional Living Program for Older Homeless Youth (often referred to as TLP), funded by the Family and Youth Services Bureau of the U.S. Department of Health and Human Services, provides residential services for up to 18 months for homeless youth ages 16 to 22.

Often older runaway, thrownaway, and homeless youth either have no home or are unable to return home because of abuse, neglect, abandonment, or severe family conflict. These youth must transition to adulthood without the support of family, leaving the youth to learn to cook and care for themselves, find jobs (often without a high school degree), and apply to college on their own. Many of these youth end up using drugs and alcohol or participating in prostitution to earn money.

TLPs provide youth with safe and stable living arrangements, which can be in the form of host family homes, group homes, maternity group homes, or supervised apartments.

TLPs also provide training and support services, either directly or by referral, to help youth develop the life skills needed to gain independence and live on their own. Types of services include: life skills training, including financial planning and responsibility, food preparation, and parenting skills; educational opportunities, including GED preparation, high-school completion support, college counseling, and vocational training; employment opportunities and assistance like career counseling, resume writing, and interview skills; substance abuse treatment or prevention; group or individual counseling; and medical care, including routine physicals and emergency treatment. Maternity group homes provide the same services as other TLPs, but also provide parenting instruction and child care.

The United States Congress first authorized funding for Transitional Living Programs through the 1988 Amendments to the Runaway and Homeless Youth Act. The program has since been funded through the Runaway, Homeless, and Missing Children Protection Act of 2003. It is currently funded by FYSB under the Reconnecting Homeless Youth Act of 2008 (Public Law 110–378).

== See also ==
- Runaway youth
- United States Department of Health and Human Services
- National Runaway Switchboard
