= Sheltersuit Foundation =

Sheltersuit is a water- and windproof jacket which can be transformed into a body suit by zipping it on the sleeping bag. It is an outdoor product made with durable and insulating materials that assures all users warmth and rain protection. After use, the sleeping bag can be stored in the duffle bag. Bas Timmer created the Sheltersuit concept with the intention to help homeless people survive temperatures below zero degrees. Production costs are €150 (US$164).

In order to offer them for free, Bas Timmer and Alexander de Groot established the Sheltersuit Foundation.
