= Society of St James =

English charity

- Abbreviation: SSJ
- Formation: 1972
- Legal status: Charity
- Purpose: Tackling homelessness
- Headquarters: Southampton
- Location: Southampton, Hampshire
- Region served: Hampshire, England
- Leader: Tania Marsh (CEO)
- Revenue: £15,268,000 (2023)
- Staff: 280 (2023)
- Volunteers: 47 (2023)
- Website: www.ssj.org.uk

The Society of St James is an English charity based in Southampton, providing accommodation with care and support to homeless and vulnerable people. The Society began in 1972 by establishing a night shelter for homeless men in St James’ Church Hall, followed by a soup run in the city.

Now, the Society manages over 25 projects, with over 550 people being housed at any one time. The Society also runs several projects supporting people in the community and an employment and training project, Jamie's, where computers are refurbished and recycled. The soup kitchen was discontinued in 2009.

The Society is a registered charity (Registered Charity Number: 1043664) and became a Housing association in 1998.

The Society is a secular organisation. It gained national media attention in 2009 when it suspended an employee for discussing religious views with a colleague during the night shift.

In 2011 the charity highlighted the issue of homelessness with a model skeleton on a sleeping bag with the sign "how long until you take notice?"
