= Raphael House =

Raphael House is a shelter in the Tenderloin, San Francisco, California, that provides transitional housing and support programs for parents and children who are experiencing homelessness.

Established in 1971 at Gough and McAllister Streets, Raphael House was the first shelter for homeless families in the city. It has been located on Sutter Street since 1977. It is a nonprofit organization and accepts no government funding, relying on San Francisco Bay Area philanthropy. Not all offers of support, however, are accepted.

From 1978 through 1999, Raphael House also operated Brother Juniper's Restaurant, an on-site breakfast café named for Saint Juniper. Although it brought Raphael House a small net profit for twenty years, the expense of renovating its kitchens and the need for additional space for the children's afterschool tutorial center combined to impel its closure.

== See also ==
- Compass Community Services
