= Welsh Presbyterian Church (Columbus, Ohio) =

Historic church in Ohio, United States

- U.S. National Register of Historic Places
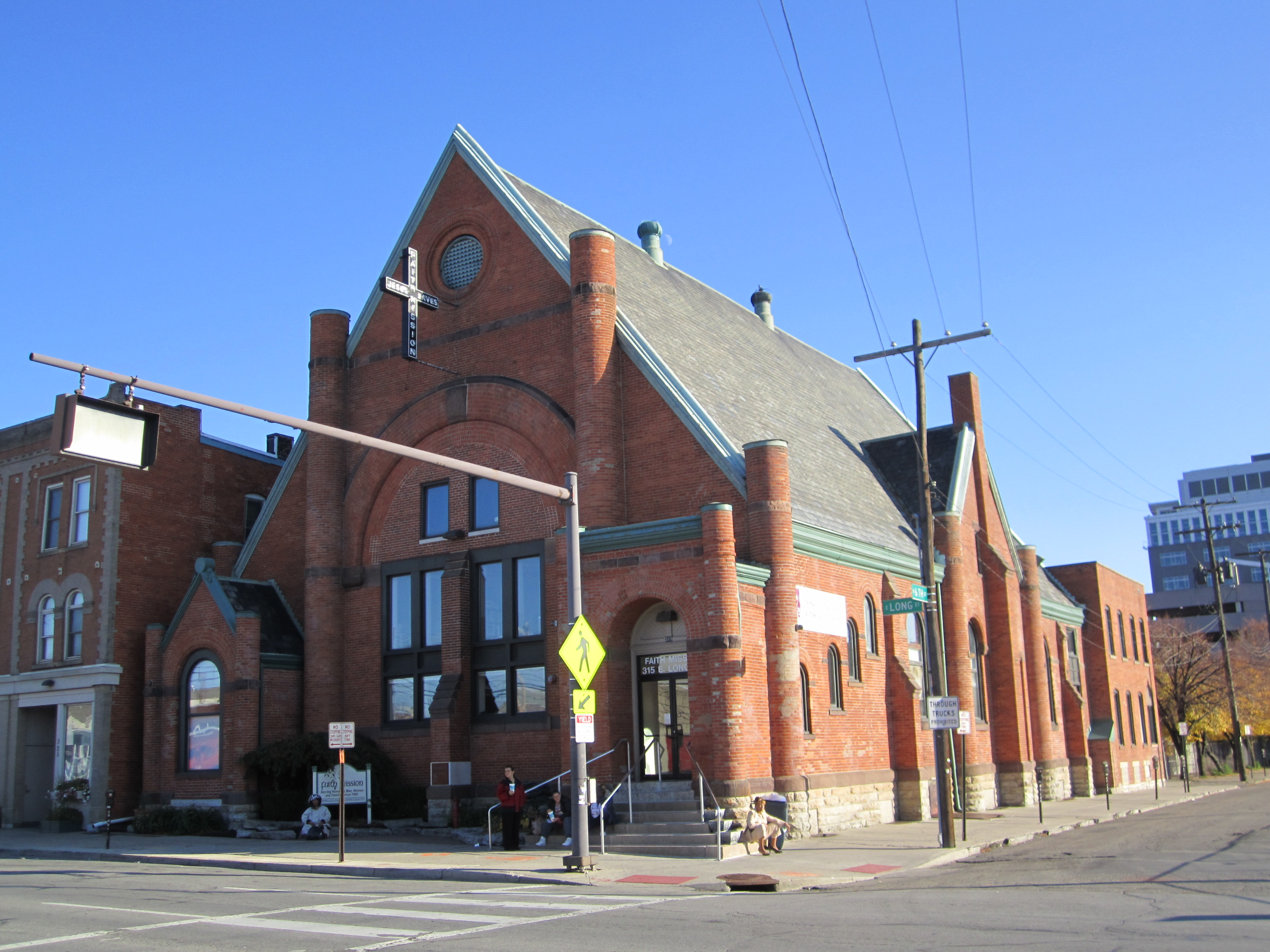
- Interactive map highlighting the building's location
- Location: 315 E. Long St., Columbus, Ohio
- Coordinates: 39°57′56″N 82°59′33″W
- Area: Less than 1 acre (0.40 ha)
- Built: 1887
- Architectural style: Romanesque Revival
- NRHP reference No.: 80003003
- Added to NRHP: November 24, 1980

The Welsh Presbyterian Church is a historic former church in Downtown Columbus, Ohio, United States. Used as a church only for a few decades, the building has seen many uses over the ensuing decades, ranging from commercial to government-affiliated to social services. Because of its architecture, the building has been named a historic site.

Founded in 1849, the Welsh Presbyterian Church first worshipped one block away from its second location. Work began on the second church building in 1887 and was finished in the following year. This building, in turn, closed in 1919 after the congregation moved farther away, and for many years the property was employed for commercial purposes. Among its tenants since that time have been the offices of Commercial Motor Freight, a factory, a store of the M.C. Lilley Company, and the offices of the Community Action Organization for the Columbus metropolitan area.

Built of brick, the Romanesque Revival building rests on a foundation of limestone, is covered with a slate roof, and features elements of sandstone. Two entrances are placed on the front of the building: one at the far left, and one at the far right, with large windows between them. The roof is steeply gabled, with an oculus near the peak on the front gable, while the single-story side walls feature both small and large windows at various heights. Cylindrical components are placed at the corners as well as occasional points on the facade. These elements combine to produce somewhat of the appearance of a fortress with turrets and buttresses.

In 1980, the Welsh Presbyterian Church was listed on the National Register of Historic Places, qualifying because of its architecture. Its significance derives partly from its location, as almost no 19th-century structures have survived in its immediate vicinity, and comparable examples of Romanesque Revival architecture are rare in downtown Columbus. The building became home to Faith Mission, a homeless shelter affiliated with Lutheran Social Services, in 1989. The shelter operated in the space until 2012, when it traded the church building to the Edwards Cos. for a larger warehouse nearby, where the shelter operates today. The Edwards Cos. redeveloped the space, utilizing historic tax credits, to become a leasing office and community space for the Normandy apartment complex.
