= Supportive Services for Veteran Families =

Federally supported housing organization for impoverished veterans

Supportive Services for Veteran Families (SSVF) was established by the United States Department of Veterans Affairs (VA) in 2011 to create public-private partnerships to rapidly re-house homeless Veteran families and prevent homelessness for very low-income Veterans at imminent risk due to a housing crisis. SSVF has been led since its inception by John Kuhn, the previous VA National Director of Homeless Evaluation.

In 2010, President Obama and VA announced the federal government's goal to end Veteran homelessness. Published by the United States Interagency Council on Homelessness (USICH), this goal was announced as part of the nation's first plan to prevent and end homelessness, titled Opening Doors. Under this mandate, VA Secretary Eric Shinseki announced the Supportive Services for Veteran Families (SSVF) program would begin providing targeted housing assistance and services on October 1, 2011.

SSVF grants are awarded through a competitive application process to private nonprofit organizations and consumer cooperatives to provide eligible Veteran families with outreach, case management, and assistance in obtaining VA and other mainstream benefits that promote housing stability and community integration. SSVF grantees can also make time-limited temporary payments on behalf of Veterans to cover rent, utilities, security deposits and moving costs.

SSVF is the first homelessness prevention and rapid re-housing program administered by VA and the first homeless program designed to serve Veterans with families.

In August 2020, President Trump announced an expansion of SSVF, authorizing $400 million in awards to support 266 grantees in all 50 states, the District of Columbia, Guam, Puerto Rico, and the U.S. Virgin Islands.

== Eligibility and Services ==
To be eligible for SSVF, a Veteran must have served at least one day of active duty, received a Military discharge other than dishonorable, have total household income that doesn't exceed 50% of the Area Median Income based on HUD guidelines for their local community, and be experiencing or at imminent risk for homelessness.

== Accreditation ==
In 2014, the Commission on Accreditation of Rehabilitation Facilities announced new standards for accreditation of rapid rehousing and homelessness prevention (RRHP) programs to support grantees of the Department of Veterans Affairs' SSVF program.

VA's National Center on Homelessness Among Veterans (NCHAV) Director said, "The NCHAV has worked closely with CARF in crafting these pioneering standards. Thanks to CARF's national standing as a leading accreditation organization for mental health and rehabilitation, the Center's work to develop research-informed standards for SSVF can now be accessed by other providers of homeless prevention and rapid rehousing services."

By 2018, 105 SSVF grantees had received CARF or COA Accreditation.

== Results ==
Despite six years of initial success, in 2017, VA Secretary David Shulkin proposed reducing funding for the program after reports showed larger numbers of Veterans becoming homeless from January 2016 to January 2017, the first reported national increase since the launch of the SSVF program. A bi-partisan response from Congress in support of the program led Secretary Shulkin to reverse his decision.

That year, NBC News featured the story of Patrick Adams, a formerly homeless Veteran who received permanent housing as a result of SSVF. NBC reported overall Veteran homelessness decreased from 2010 to 2016 by 47 percent.

HUD Secretary Ben Carson announced in November 2019 that Veteran homelessness was again declining, reporting a 2.1 percent decrease during the fiscal year. "This year’s estimate finds 37,085 veterans experienced homelessness in January 2019, compared to 37,878 reported in January 2018," Secretary Carson reported.

By 2020, the SSVF program was largely credited with ending Veteran homelessness in 78 communities and three states. From SSVF's inception in 2011 to 2019, 14 states reduced Veteran homelessness by more than 50 percent. During that period, New York reported reducing Veteran homelessness by 78 percent.

== Response to 2020 coronavirus pandemic ==
In July 2020, VA announced it would provide $400 million in additional funding to SSVF grantees for emergency assistance to Veterans impacted by the COVID-19 pandemic. Funds were awarded from the Coronavirus Aid, Relief and Economic Security Act, which allocated $17.2 billion for the Veterans Health Administration.

VA highlighted five priorities during the COVID-19 crisis to enable the program to evolve into an emergency response and permanent housing program combined:

- Connect all Veterans to permanent housing, whenever possible, either via SSVF or other resources
- Maintain enrollment for eligible Veterans so SSVF can continue to provide and re-introduce assistance should the Veteran family become at risk of housing loss
- End unsheltered homelessness for all Veterans and ensure Veterans at risk of serious illness or death from COVID-19 are not living in congregate shelter or transitional housing settings.
- Prevent homelessness for those Veterans at risk of losing their housing due to the COVID-19 crisis or otherwise
- Support HUD-VASH placements for veterans needing Housing Search Support or financial assistance.

SSVF grantees in communities that had ended chronic Veteran homelessness in preceding years reported significant increases in the numbers of homeless and at-risk Veterans requesting help as a result of the pandemic. At the same time; federal lawmakers were seeking more rigorous oversight of services to Veterans housed at state-run care facilities.
