= Sanyukai =

Sanyukai Nonprofit Organization, Incorporated
- Founded: 1984, Tokyo, Japan
- Purpose: Homelessness
- Region served: Local and nearby districts
- Method: Healthcare, Legal Aid, Outreach
- Website: Sanyukai

Sanyukai Nonprofit Organization Inc. (山友会) is an official nonprofit organization dedicated to the aid of the homeless population in Tokyo, Japan. Sanyukai's services include a free clinic, as well as an outreach program which distributes food and clothing to the homeless in the area.

== Structure ==
Sanyukai is located in the San'ya district in Tokyo, Japan. The building has three floors, and includes the free Sanyu clinic, a kitchen where food is prepared for the Outreach Program, and an office where free legal advice is offered. Sanyukai also hosts events in an effort to bring the community together in aiding the homeless.

== Clinic ==
Located on the first floor of the Sanyukai building, Sanyu Clinic is one of the few free clinics in Tokyo. Homeless members of society can receive consultations with professional doctors and nurses. Depending on the diagnosis, the patient may receive medical advice, free prescription medication, or a ride to the hospital for intensive care. Most of the clinic staff are medical professionals volunteering on their time off. At this point, Sanyu clinic hosts nine doctors, one chiropractor, four acupuncturists, and six nurses. Working full-time at Sanyukai is one registered nurse who is also the clinic coordinator; another nurse works part-time.

== Outreach program ==
Centered around the kitchen on the second floor, the Outreach Program strives to provide the homeless with free meals and decent clothing. Several times a week, Sanyukai will prepare individually wrapped meals and go on patrol in the area. Concentrating on the parks and riverside areas homeless individuals frequent, these patrols provide free meals and conversation. This Program works to not only provide the homeless with daily needs, but also establish Sanyukai as a place of safety and help for them. While providing food, the patrol also takes note of everyone's health, sometimes recommending a visit to the Sanyu Clinic. The Outreach Program works to establish and maintain connections with the homeless in the area, to more effectively aid those in need.

== Social center ==
Another aspect of Sanyukai is how it functions as a gathering place for the homeless in the area. Every day, a large group of people can be found in front of the building, joking and socializing. Most of the homeless people in the area are middle aged or elderly men who are out of work and have no real family. Sanyukai functions as a place where these people can relax and socialize. The volunteers provide green tea and other basic things at the Sanyukai entrance that help these people on a daily basis. The homeless are provided with toothbrushes, shaving razors, towels, hand soap, and laundry detergent, to help them maintain their hygiene and health. Once a month, a barber volunteers his services and spends a day giving as many free haircuts as he can. Overall, Sanyukai is not only a place where the homeless go when they are sick or starving, but rather, a landmark where they are welcomed and taken care of.
