= First Step Back Home =

U.S. non-profit organization

- Abbreviation: FSBH
- Type: 501(c)(3) non-profit organization
- Purpose: Help single homeless men achieve financial independence and self sufficiency, and support deprived families in emergency situations.
- Location: Ofallon, Missouri
- Region served: Missouri, United States
- Members: Community Council of St. Charles Continuum
- Founder, President: Paul W Kruse
- Main organ: Board of Directors
- Affiliations: St. Joachim of Missouri, Ann Care Center, Salvation Army, North East Community Action Corporation, and other Social Agencies Serving the Homeless
- Staff: 12
- Website: firststepbackhome.net

First Step Back Home (FSBH) is a 501(c)(3) non-profit organization, chartered as a faith based Christian Ministry to help single homeless men to achieve financial independence and self-sufficiency, in Ofallon, Missouri. It was founded by Vietnam veteran and social worker Paul W Kruse and his wife Lana Kruse. It has helped many homeless and hopeless people in St. Charles, Lincoln and Warren Counties of Missouri, to find a stable home and job. Since 2005, FSBH has helped more than 3,000 homeless people become self-sufficient. It has been running programs with the help of Community Council of St. Charles Continuum.

== History ==
FSBH was started in March 2005 by Paul Kruse, a Vietnam Veteran who served in US Navy as Airman and Seaman. Paul and his wife started Trucker Church Ministry in Foristell, Missouri, with now more than 2,500 truckers who have attended services and have heard the Gospel preached for over 6 and a half years. He became aware of the lack of resources and gaps in services provided by the local social service providers for homeless men in St. Charles County, and started his Ministry spawned by a $1000 gift from a local business.

FSBH has helped more than 3000 homeless in the area to get lodging, food, clothing, jobs, find transportation, and ultimately become self-sustaining again. Support for FSBH has come from the community via businesses, community groups and individual contributions and none has come from the Federal or local government.

== Board of directors ==
FSBH is operated by the local staff of people, who come from various backgrounds. The board members help most in making decisions regarding future project expansion and donation programs.

Members	Designation	Organization Affilitiation
Paul W Kruse	Founder	(United States) First Step Back Home
Lana Kruse	Treasurer	(United States) St. Joseph Hospital West
Chuck Gatschenberger	Secretary	(United States) MO House of Representatives
Chris Bray	Member	(United States) PolyOne Corporation
Mayor Paul Lambi	Member	(United States) Mayor of Wentzville, Missouri
Dave Bonney	Member	(United States) Computer Consultant
Carla Campbell	Member	(United States) House of Refuge Ministries
bgcolor=98FB98		(United States)

== Ministry ==
The group believes that self-sufficiency and permanent housing are God given rights, and therefore aim to provide help in the form of crisis intervention to the poor and prevention of homelessness in a one stop shop. The group also intends to serve as a Christian witness by this service, and to expand it to other states, foreign and domestic.

== Awards and recognition ==
FSBH and its members have received awards for their efforts towards the homeless and poor in the community, by the local community, corporations and government.

- Paul Kruse, the founder of FSBH was the recipient of the FOCUS St. Louis "What’s Right with the Region" Award given on May 11, 2006, at a celebration and reception at the Sheldon Concert Hall in St. Louis, Missouri, for his efforts made through FSBH towards poor people of his community.
- Paul and Lana Kruse were the recipient of Senior Service Award, given by Lieutenant Governor Peter Kinder of St. Louis, for their work on behalf of poor and homeless carried out through FSBH, on July 15, 2011

== Fundraising and donations ==
FSBH primarily raises fund through donations made by private corporations and local community.

- FSBH received Operation Round Up Grant of $3,000 from Cuivre River Electric Community Trust to support area's homeless people in December 2011, and $5,000 in May 2010.
- The Mission Awareness Team of Lake St. Louis Hospital, St. Louis, Missouri, raised $457 for FSBH's homeless program in October 2007.

It organizes various programs on special occasions, such as Christmas, New Year and Easter to generate funds to help the poor, including on the group's website. Many local churches and corporations have helped to generate funds for FSBH.
