= Operation Safety Net =

Street medicine program in Pennsylvania, US

Operation Safety Net (OSN) is a Street Medicine program in Pittsburgh, Pennsylvania, and one of the nation's first full-time street-based delivery medical systems. OSN was founded in 1992 when Dr. Jim Withers and Mike Sallows began to make field visits to the homeless in Pittsburgh. In time, other formerly homeless outreach workers and medical volunteers joined the effort. In 1993, OSN became a nonprofit organization under the Pittsburgh Mercy Health System with Linda Sheets as the program administrator.

Operation Safety Net visits the homeless through walking teams medical outreach staff. Most of OSN's work force are volunteers. Withers was one of the ten recipients out of the 463 nominees of the $120,000 by the Robert Wood Johnson Community Health Leadership Program in 2002 and $105,000 of which was allocated to OSN.
