= Projects for Assistance in Transition from Homelessness =

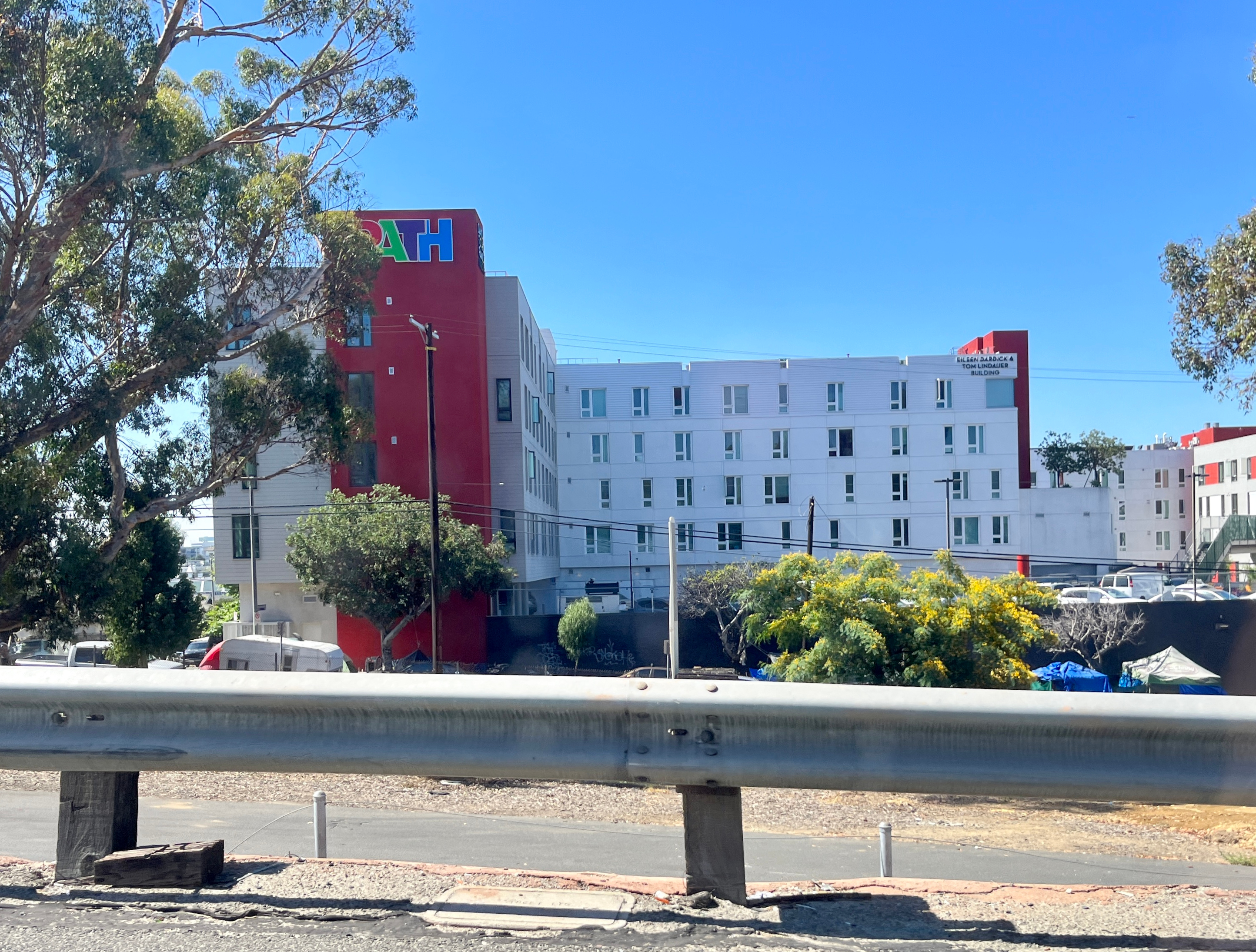
PATH building, Los Angeles

Created under the McKinney-Vento Act, The PATH (Projects for Assistance in Transition from Homelessness) Program, is a formula grant program that funds the 50 States, District of Columbia, Puerto Rico, and four U.S. Territories to support service delivery to individuals with serious mental illnesses, as well as individuals with co-occurring substance use disorders, who are homeless or at risk of becoming homeless. The Substance Abuse and Mental Health Services Administration (SAMHSA) provides technical assistance to states and local providers funded by the PATH program. This includes on-site consultation, collection of annual reporting data, the development of an annual report to Congress, holding bi-annual meetings of PATH contacts, and identifying and disseminating best practices from the program.

The PATH Consumer Involvement Workgroup's guiding vision was to encourage PATH programs to employ mental health consumers with homelessness experience as direct care staff.

== See also ==
- Self-help groups for mental health
- Twelve-step program
