= Huckleberry House =

Youth shelter in San Francisco, California

Coordinates: 37°46′17″N 122°26′32″W

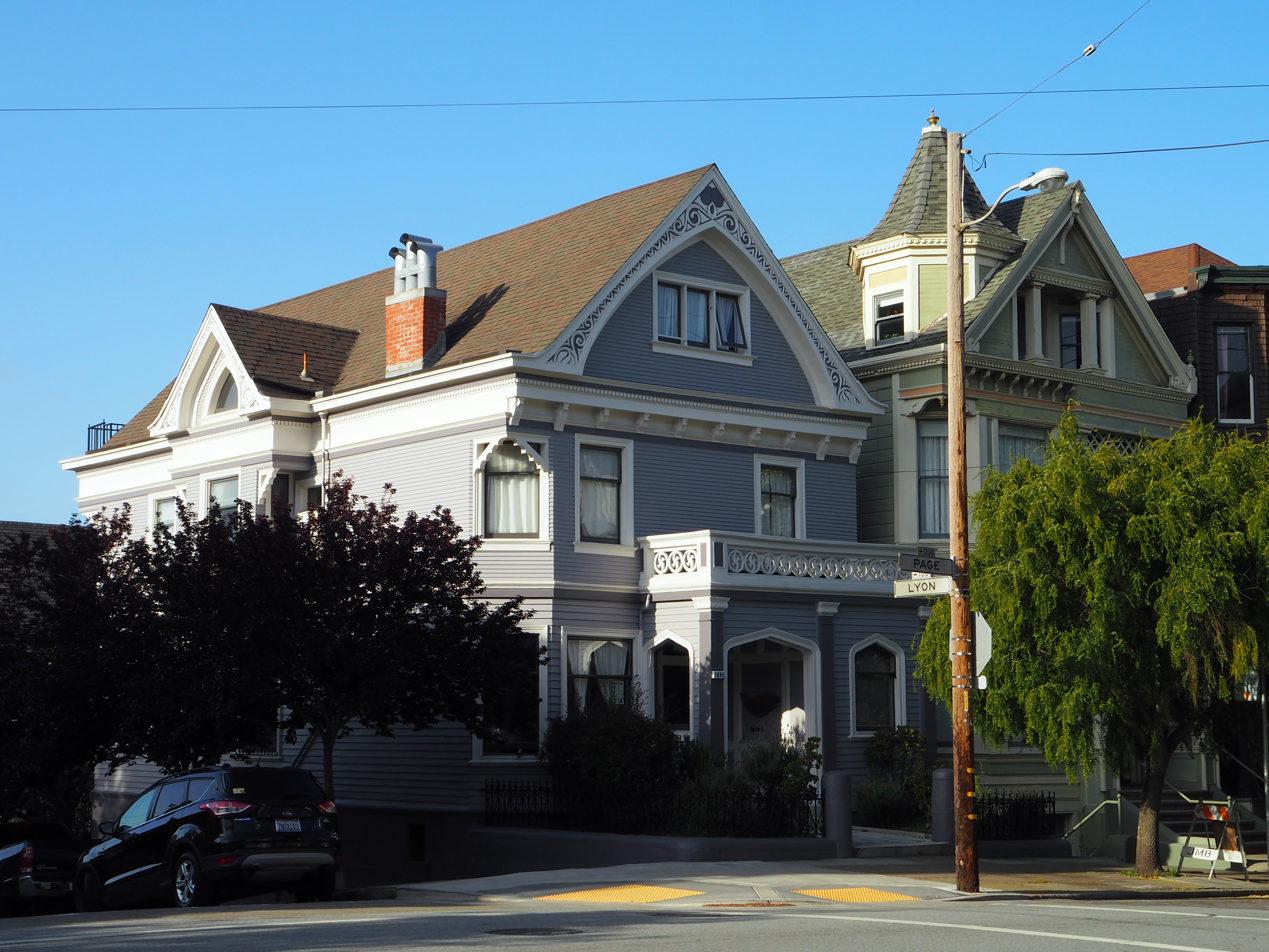
- Founded: 1967
- Founder: Larry Beggs
- Type: Homeless shelter
- Legal status: 501(c)(3) organization
- Purpose: Alleviate problems of runaway and homeless youth
- Location: 1292 Page Street, San Francisco CA
- Parent organization: Huckleberry Youth Programs
- Budget: US$6.1 million (2017)
- Website: https://www.huckleberryyouth.org/crisis-shelter/
- Formerly called: Huckleberry's for Runaways

Huckleberry House is a shelter for runaway and homeless youth located in the Haight-Ashbury district of San Francisco, California. Huckleberry House was the first runaway shelter for youth in the US, founded during the Summer of Love on June 18, 1967, by several churches and the San Francisco Foundation.

Huckleberry House is operated by Huckleberry Youth Programs and is located at 1292 Page St. in the Haight-Ashbury district of San Francisco.

Huckleberry Youth Programs also sponsors Huckleberry Youth Health Center on Cole Street in San Francisco, Huckleberry's Community Assessment and Resource Center in San Francisco, and the Huckleberry Teen Health Program at Montecito shopping center in San Rafael, California.

The San Francisco public library has historical archives of the Huckleberry House, including letters between teen runaways and Larry Beggs.

== History ==
Huckleberry's for Runaways was founded at 1 Broderick St. in the Haight-Ashbury District of San Francisco on June 18, 1967, during the Summer of Love. It was funded by the San Francisco Foundation under John May, with Glide Foundation as the fiduciary sponsor hiring the original two co-directors, Edward Larry Beggs and Barbara Brachman.

Through the years it received additional grants from the federal government. In 1974, the U.S. Congress passed the National Runaway Act, which decriminalized teenage runaway behavior and reallocated government funding from juvenile hall warehousing of runaways to non-incarcerating community agencies like Huckleberry's. By creating a viable alternative to juvenile hall detention and punishment for runaways, Congress was able to change the juvenile justice system to one that worked with runaways and their parents on a voluntary basis with face-to-face communication between runaways and their parents using the tools of family therapy counseling to resolve family conflicts.

Much of the historical data about Huckleberry's is on file in the City of San Francisco special library collection at the main library at the Civic Center. This includes the actual correspondence by runaways, their parents, and the director Edward Larry Beggs. An out of print 1969 Ballantine Books paperback "Huckleberry's for Runaways" might still be available in used book stores accessible through the internet.
