= Compass Family Services =

US non-profit organization

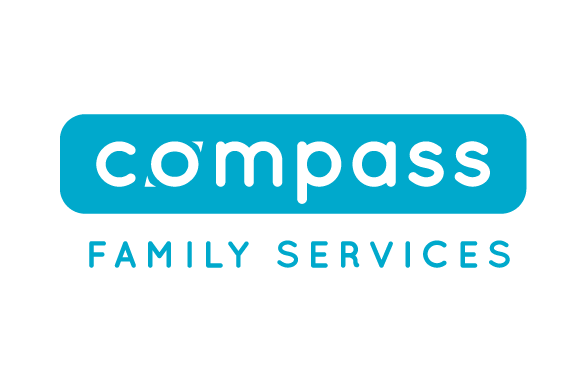
- Formation: 1914
- Type: Non-profit organization
- Purpose: Human services
- Headquarters: San Francisco, CA
- Region served: San Francisco Bay Area
- Executive Director: Erica Kisch
- Budget: US$14.2 million(2018)
- Website: www.compass-sf.org

Compass Family Services is a 501(c)(3) non-profit organization in San Francisco, California, that provides a wide variety of human services to homeless and at-risk of homelessness families. In 2019, they served 6,000 parents and children. Its services include intake and referral to shelter, emergency shelter, transitional housing, and childcare—in addition to a broad spectrum of counseling, parenting education, prevention, and support services.

== Mission ==
Compass Family Services serves San Francisco families facing homelessness to help them secure stable housing and attain economic self-sufficiency and family well-being.

== History ==
Compass Family Services, known until 1995 as Travelers Aid San Francisco, was established in 1914 to provide assistance to newcomers to the city, particularly young women and girls drawn by the Panama-Pacific International Exposition in 1915. Since that time, Compass has served a wide range of populations, from stranded travelers to refugees to homeless families, but a common denominator among the various groups has been a need for help in an often unfriendly urban environment.

In 1976, the agency responded to the need for respite childcare among the growing number of families making use of its services by opening the Tenderloin Childcare Center (now called Compass Children's Center). In 1990, the Tenderloin Childcare Center became the first licensed childcare center in San Francisco to reserve slots exclusively for homeless and children from families with extremely low incomes. Homeless children experience developmental delays at four times the rate of other children and almost 50 percent have emotional problems such as anxiety and depression. In 2002 TLC opened moved into its own building allowing the center to enroll 72 children and offer infant care for the first time. TLC's specialization in this population allows them to quickly assess and respond to such issues when they are identified in their students.

In 1990, in response to the burgeoning crisis of family homelessness, the agency opened an emergency shelter program, Compass Family Center (CFC), providing homeless families with short-term housing, counseling and referrals and assistance in obtaining permanent housing. Homeless families represent the fastest growing segment of homeless people in the U.S. and forty percent of the entire population are children and families In 1995 an aftercare component was added along with pre-employment and psychotherapy services.

In 1995, Compass Community Services opened Clara House, a long-term supportive housing program. Families entering this program are given the opportunity to live in a stable service-enriched environment for up to two years while preparing to maintain permanent housing on their own. The program came under scrutiny from San Francisco homeless advocates for its proposed program rules requiring all families referred to the program to provide proof of their legal status in the U.S. This stipulation was added because under the recently adopted Proposition 187 undocumented individuals were barred from publicly financed employment services - a central piece of the Clara House program. Clara House then received a quarter of is funding from the City of San Francisco and it was unclear if they would legally be able to serve undocumented clients. The program ultimately decided to remove legal immigration status as a requirement for admission.

Also in 1995, at the request of and with funding from the San Francisco Human Services Agency, the agency began Connecting Point (CP), which serves as the central intake and assessment center for any family in San Francisco needing to access the city's shelter system. In 2007, CP was awarded a contract in partnership with the Eviction Defense Collaborative to provide rental assistance that allows families to maintain housing before they become homeless.

In 2006, CFC received a three-year grant through the SF First Five Commission to provide parent-child services with the goal of improving the developmental outcomes for children ages 0–5. The result was the Positive Parenthood Project, which outreaches to homeless families with children ages 0–5 and offers a range a support services. In 2007 CFC was awarded a contract, in joint venture with Catholic Charities CYO, to provide housing subsidies to families that are either homeless or at imminent risk of becoming homeless. This program follows the housing first principal adopted by all San Francisco agencies in 2007 that provide services to homeless families. This approach places an emphasis on rapidly rehousing families or preventing them from losing their existing housing preventing families entering the cycle of homelessness in the first place. The project, SF HOME, provides intensive services to participating families to assist them to increase their income through employment and training.

Compass has been recognized as one of the Best Non-Profits in the Bay Area by the San Francisco chapter of the Association for Corporate Growth (ACG) and has been awarded the national Mutual of America Community Partnership Award. Compass has been one of 23 agencies nationwide to be awarded a federal grant through the U.S. Department of Housing & Urban Development to rapidly re-house homeless families.

== See also ==
- Raphael House
