= South Park Inn =

Homeless shelter in Connecticut, U.S.

Coordinates: 41.7565°N 72.6764°W

South Park Inn is an emergency homeless shelter located at 75 Main Street in Hartford, Connecticut. It was founded in 1982. Before the building was a shelter, it was once the South Park Methodist Church.

Clients of the South Park Inn are assigned counselors who help with transportation, provide personal hygiene supplies, and help find housing. Clients must be 18 years old to stay. The shelter opens at 5:00 p.m. and closes at 8:00 p.m. for adults. The first floor is for male sleeping corridors and the second floor is for females and children to sleep. Everyone that stays at the shelter must do chores. 171 children stayed in the shelter in 2004. South Park Inn also has a program for men called Transitional Living which is for 33 homeless men who are motivated to make substantive changes in their lives.
