= Karluk Manor =

Homeless shelter in Anchorage, Alaska, US

Karluk Manor is a housing facility for homeless alcoholics in Anchorage, Alaska. It is targeted for homeless alcoholics who are not yet ready to quit drinking. It was Alaska's first Housing First residence and has attracted significant controversy. The project was approved in 2010 by the Anchorage Planning Commission by a vote of 7–2.
