= I Have A Name Project =

Homelessness awareness project

- Formation: 2007
- Purpose: Homelessness awareness and advocacy
- Headquarters: Phoenix, Arizona
- Region served: United States
- Founder: Jon Linton
- Website: ihaveaname.org/

The I Have A Name Project (IHAN) strives to raise awareness about homelessness and empathy for the homeless. The project has displayed photos of homeless people in exhibits and has been influential and popular on social media.

== Founding ==
In 2007, Jon Linton—a photographer based out of Phoenix, Arizona—began a project to document homelessness in Phoenix to create awareness and bring about change. While working on the project, Linton walked around Phoenix. He came across a man who was holding a sign that said he was Vietnam War Veteran, Chuck Ridgeway, and Linton asked him his name. The man began to weep, and said "You have no idea how long it has been since someone cared to ask my name." After interviewing Ridgeway, Linton interviewed and photographed other people living on the streets, to learn their names and help the public learn about homelessness in Arizona and the United States. After the 2008 recession in the United States, Linton had to postpone the project. In 2013, Linton created a video with the photos he had taken in 2007 and posted it on Facebook. After two weeks, 30,000 people had seen the video. Barry Goldwater's provided pro bono legal assistance for the project. A crowdfunding effort raised money for the project. In September 2013, Linton created a Facebook page for the project.

Linton is a long-time resident of Arizona. As a college student, Linton would give change in his pocket to help the needy. Linton has written about homeless youth and homelessness. Linton has described the homeless world as an "Invisible World." Linton works in art-book by day and published I Have a Name, a 96-page soft-cover book.

Other artists have contributed to the project. Since its founding, IHAN has also expanded beyond photography to paintings, mixed media, and written word. IHAN aimed to make a mural relating to homelessness. Linton believes that college students can help the homeless.

== Photo exhibits ==
Linton and the project have put on photo exhibits in Phoenix and Tucson, Arizona. In the exhibits, the photos were only accompanied by the names of the subjects. The photos have been described as having quiet solidity, an air of survived desertion, simple, and giving of an air of aloneness. IHAN displayed photos in conjunction with the Carlos G. Figueroa foundation. Figueroa was an Arizona homeless man who was murdered and robbed in 2003. One observer wrote: "the subject claims his or her identity and becomes more than just a face passed on the street." One exhibit in Arizona was dedicated to a homeless teen, Summer Francis Smith, who died.

In 2015, I Have A Named showed their photos in Los Angeles, California, with other artists. After the 2015 exhibit in Los Angeles, Linton stated that there may not be anymore exhibits and he will devote his time to homelessness outreach.

== Influence ==
The I Have A Name Project has used social media extensively, gaining more than 40,000 followers across Twitter, Facebook, and Instagram. Adrian Grenier mentioned IHAN on his instagram account. IHAN has gained attention in 44 different countries. Linton said: "I get messages from anyone from a woman in Juneau, Alaska to someone in Sydney, Australia that suggest that, 'You've changed the way I think about this situation, thank you,'" Through IHAN, the mother of a homeless teen, who was killed, gave a message: "Summer was a tortured but beautiful free spirit. Summer was an angel."
