= The Booth Centre =

British homeless charity based in Manchester

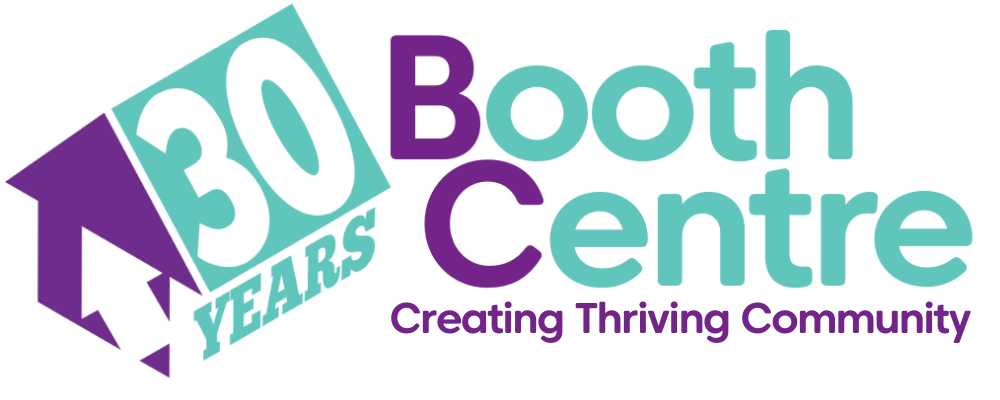
- Founded: 1995; 31 years ago
- Type: Not-for-profit organisation
- Purpose: Homeless community
- Location: Manchester, United Kingdom
- Region served: Manchester
- Services: Emergency accommodation, health and wellbeing for homeless people
- Website: www.boothcentre.org.uk

The Booth Centre is a British registered charity which provides a day centre for homeless people in Manchester. The centre is located on Pimblett Street in the city centre. The centre provides a place for homeless people to access support and advice, and also runs activities that homeless people can get involved in.

== History ==
The Booth Centre was established in 1995 to help support homeless people in Manchester. Initially the charity operated from a room within Manchester Cathedral, but in March 2014 the charity relocated to a new premises on Pimblett Street in the city centre. The new building was named Edward Holt House and allowed the charity to offer improved facilities for the homeless community, including shower and changing facilities and IT equipment.

== Awards and recognition ==
In 2010 The Booth Centre was a runner-up in the National Day Centre of the Year awards and received Champion status from the Department of Communities and Local Government in recognition of its hard work to reduce the number of rough sleepers in Manchester. In 2015 the charity was honoured with The Queen's Award for Voluntary Service.
