= Tilth Alliance Youth Garden Works =

U.S. nonprofit organization

Tilth Alliance Youth Garden Works, formerly known as Seattle Youth Garden Works, is a non-profit organization in Seattle, Washington, United States. It works with homeless and under-served youth. SYGW was founded in 1995 by Margaret Hauptman. In 2010, Seattle Youth Garden Works merged with Seattle Tilth.

The program provides garden-based learning and employment at one location—the U District gardens. The youth go through a comprehensive, multi-week, paid training program that teaches soil chemistry, biology, customer management, and marketing. The youth also sell their produce at the University District Farmers Market.

In addition to the job-skills training, Garden Works, as it is commonly known in Seattle, also provides job seeking assistance including resume writing and assisting youth in obtaining proper identification, and helps in finding housing if the youth is not currently sheltered.
