= Mad Housers =

Mad Housers, Inc. is a non-profit corporation based in Atlanta and engaged in charitable work, research and education.

== History ==
=== Early history (1987–1999) ===
The Mad Housers first emerged in 1987, founded by graduate students Michael Connor and Brian Finkel, of Georgia Tech's College of Architecture, to address the problem of homelessness in Atlanta.

Based on their research and plans, Connor, Finkel and three other architecture students built the first hut. It was a small 6' by 8' by 6' plywood box "outfitted with a bed and shelves for [the client's] belongings". However, it was dry and kept "out the wind and the rain. This first experiment at housing the homeless was different from their later attempts: they built the house at a particular location and left it there to see what would happen. After two days, someone had claimed the house, moved it to a more concealed location and "reassembled [it] more practically than the prototype". The group no longer works in this haphazard manner. They "select clients beforehand, making sure they actually want huts and usually getting them to assist in construction". They also try to choose their sites based on where homeless people already live. The group also became much more efficient builders in just their first year. They were able to erect a hut in just 20 minutes and began to use salvaged materials to build the huts "cutting the cost from 'the $200 [they] spent on the first hut to $25 to $40 each".

The huts built by the volunteers are technically illegal as they are sited on private and government properties, violating building codes, and thus some officials considered them an infraction of law. By June 1989, Department of Parks, Recreation, and Cultural Affairs had torn down two huts near a residential area, and Georgia Department of Transportation had removed one built on their access land.

Mad Housers' policy is to help their clients squat on small lots away from general view in industrial areas or near the edge of transportation facilities. Their largest community as of 1999 had 21 huts. Before clients receive their huts, Mad Housers informs their clients that where they intend on squatting is considered trespassing.

=== 1999- ===
Tracy Woodard and Nick Hess took over the organization in 1999 and have been building huts at a rate of about 15 per year near where campers are already camping. As of 2019, partner agencies such as Intown Cares and MercyCare began offering regular services to Mad Houser clients in Atlanta such as case management, medical treatment, and permanent housing solutions.

== Reception ==
The newspaper and magazine articles of the late 1980s tended to emphasize the secretive nature of the organization describing them as "guerrilla hut-builders", a "secret society of sorts", and having "the air of a fraternity prank". This image of secrecy was in fact an integral component of the organization for the first few years. As one Mad Houser explained in a newspaper article, "secrecy was necessary […] to avoid arrest and prevent the Georgia Department of Transportation […] from tearing them down".

In July 1988, they participated in a demonstration for the homeless at the Democratic National Convention. Since then, they have continued to bring "the plight of the homeless to public attention". Then, in 1990, an hour-long documentary aired on 90 TV stations around the nation, dramatizing the Mad Houser's work.

Important Atlanta events such as the 1988 Democratic National Convention (and presumably the 1996 Olympics) also created tension between the city and the Mad Housers as the authorities reacted by clearing out several sites. However, the Mad Housers were able to reach an "informal alliance with local officials and the city police". As one article pointed out, "the mayors seem to have realized these are not normal times. We can't deal in niceties and fine points here".

Even though the huts were welcomed by homeless people, municipal officials obligated to uphold vagrancy laws and building codes were not enthusiastic, and their reactions in 2004 were between "grudging tolerance to outrage." While the dwellings provide shelter, they violate zoning ordinances and building codes.

== Phenomenology of the huts ==
Several articles mention how the clients arrange their personal possessions in their hut with special significance because they did not have that luxury before. Having a hut is a transformational experience for the clients.
