= Wintringham Specialist Aged Care =

Australian welfare organisation

Wintringham is a not-for-profit Australian welfare organisation which provides services to older people who are homeless or vulnerable to homelessness.

In 2011, Wintringham was awarded by the United Nations, the Habitat Scroll of Honour Award at its World Habitat Day ceremony in Aguascalientes Mexico.

== History ==
Bryan Lipmann, founder and CEO of Wintringham

Wintringham was established in 1989 by Bryan Lipmann AM. He had been working as a jackaroo in the bush and, on returning to Melbourne, undertook a Social Work degree. He got a job working at Gordon House, one of Melbourne's night shelters, where up to 300 homeless men and women lived, some of them for years, under scarifying conditions.

In November 2015, the Lord Mayor of Melbourne awarded Bryan Lipmann "Melburnian of the Year'.

In July 2025, Bryan Lipmann AM retired as CEO of Wintringham after 36 years. The second CEO of Wintringham is Jane Barnes, who took over from Bryan in July 2025, and was previously Wintringham’s Chief of Staff.

== Awards ==
In 1998, Port Melbourne Hostel was the first Australian building to win the prestigious World Habitat Award.

In 2011, Wintringham was awarded the United Nations Habitat Scroll of Honour. In the citation, UN Habitat stated that “This is the first time UN-HABITAT recognises an initiative devoted to the elderly, and the first time an Australian project has been awarded.”

In 2018, Wintringham was HESTA Aged Care Awards Outstanding Organisation winner.
