= FareStart =

U.S. nonprofit organization

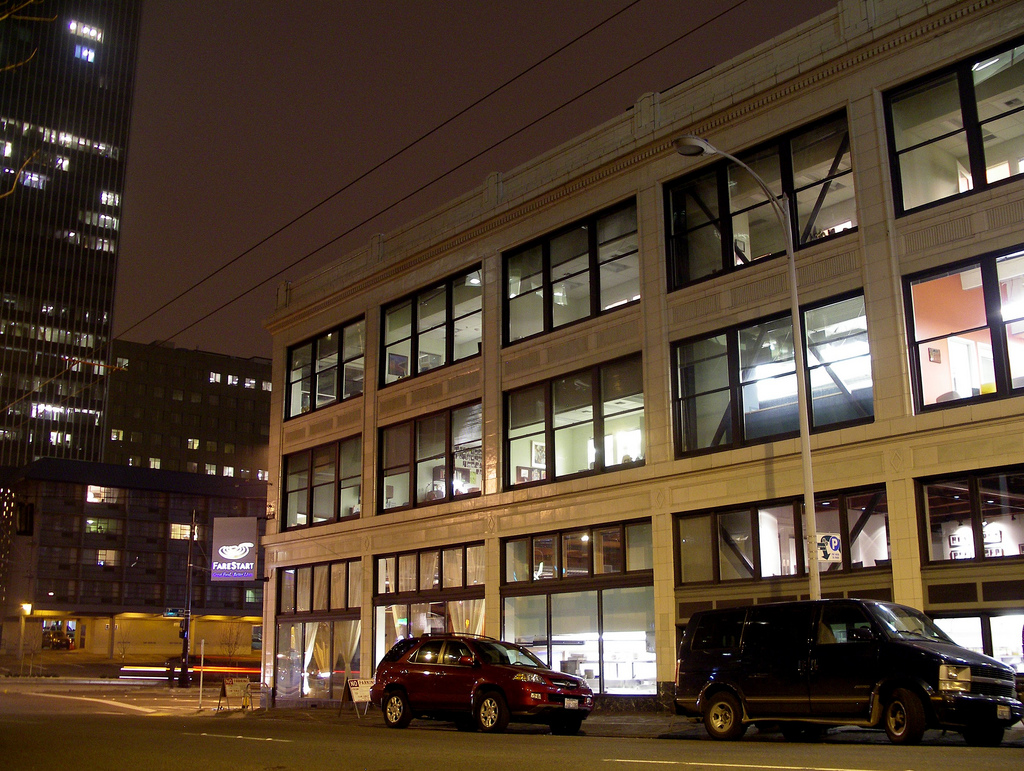
- Founded: 1988
- Founder: David Lee
- Type: 501(c)(3)
- Purpose: Homelessness
- Coordinates: 47.615193°N 122.337471°W
- Region served: Seattle, Washington, US
- Services: Vocational education, job placement
- Website: farestart.org

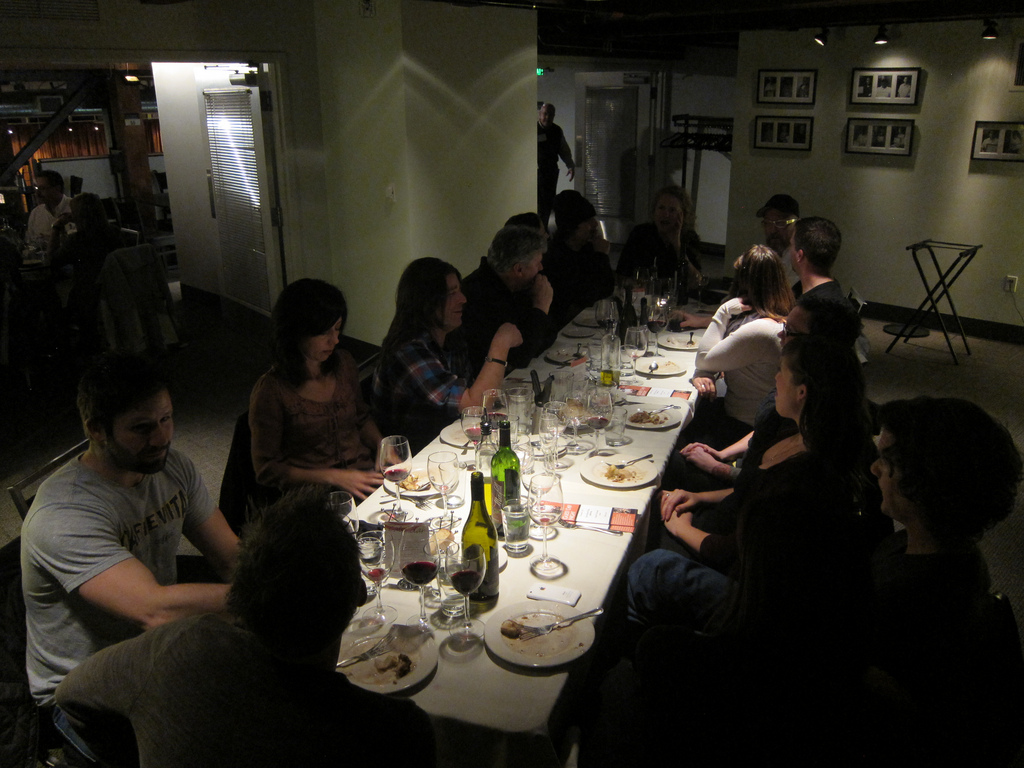
Guest Chef night

FareStart is a nonprofit organization in Seattle, Washington, US, that provides restaurant industry job training for the disadvantaged and homeless.

== History ==
FareStart originally started as a for-profit provider of meals to homeless shelters under the name Common Meals, but became a non-profit in 1992. Common Meals was established in 1988 by David Lee.

In 2011, FareStart received the "Humanitarian of the Year" award from the James Beard Foundation.

In March 2020, FareStart converted their operations to feed those in need during the global coronavirus pandemic. Food was donated from restaurants and organizations that had to close down. Precautions were made to keep the staff safe while they prepared meals for 70 local organizations. As of May 2023, they have produced 5.9 million meals and enrolled close to 600 people in their training programs.
