= Family and Youth Services Bureau =

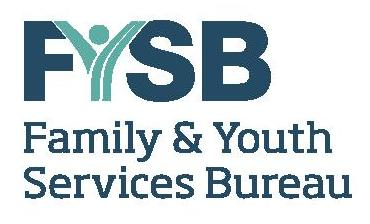
FYSB logo as of 2018

The Family and Youth Services Bureau (FYSB) is a division of the US Executive Branch under the Administration for Children and Families and the Department of Health and Human Services. The FYSB's primary purpose is to support programs for at-risk youth and their families.

The FYSB is organized into two major divisions, which administer three principle programs. These are the Division of Adolescent Development and Support, which administers the Runaway and Homeless Youth Program and the Adolescent Pregnancy Prevention Program, and the Division of Family Violence Prevention and Services, which administers the Family Violence Prevention and Services Program.

== Runaway and Homeless Youth Program ==
The Runaway and Homeless Youth Program (RHYP) was first established in 1974 through passage of the Runaway Youth Act. The RHYP administers the National Runaway Safeline, a 24 hour hotline for adolescents in crisis, which provides educational resources and technical assistance, and the National Clearinghouse on Runaway and Homeless Youth, founded in 1992, and which serves as a central repository for information related to runaway or homeless youth.

The RHYP provides services to approximately 30,000 individuals through emergency shelters, and houses between 3,500 and 4,000 youths per year. As of 2014 the program was funded at a rate of $115 million annually.

The program overall is divided into three major components:

=== The Basic Center Program ===
The Basic Center Program provides "intervention, temporary shelter, counselling, and after-care services" through a network of emergency shelters mostly housed in local non-profits or public health departments. Shelter is provided for youths for a period of up to 21 days, which includes individual and family counseling for a range of issues, which may include educational assistance, vocational training, job searching, and exit planning if needed, to make arrangements for after they depart the shelter.

Annual funding for the 2015 fiscal year was $53 million, with 296 grantees. Of those served by the program in the 2014 fiscal year, 52% were female and 48% were male; 3% were under the age of 10, while 37% were age 11 to 14, and 60% were age 15 to 17; and finally 51% were white, while 32% were black and 20% were Hispanic or Latino. A total of 86% were living in a private residence prior to entry in the program, and 67% were attending school regularly. The same year, centers had to turn away 2,425 youths who contacted them for services due to lack of available space.

Overall, 90% of those staying in Basic Centers transition to a stable living situation, and 70% return to the home of a parent or guardian.

=== The Transitional Living Program ===
The Transitional Living Program provides "long-term housing and supportive services" to those age 16 to 21. These may include life-skills building, interpersonal skills building, educational assistance, vocational assistance, behavioral health care and physical health care. Services are normally provided for a period of 540 days, although those who remain in the program for longer than 635 days may remain until they turn 18 years old.

The annual funding for the 2015 fiscal year was $44 million, with 200 grantees. Of those served by the program in the 2014 fiscal year, 60% were female and 39% were male; 45% were white, 39% black, and 16% Hispanic or Latino; and finally, 4% were under the age of 16, while 40% were age 17 to 19, 46% were age 19 to 20, and 10% were over the age of 21. The same year the program was forced to turn away 4,842 youths who contacted them for services due to lack of space, including 801 who were placed on waiting lists.

Overall, 88% of those leaving transitional living go on to find stable housing, 38% had attained a high school diploma or GED, and 27% were employed while 46% were seeking employment.

=== Street Outreach Program ===
The Street Outreach Program (also known as the Education and Prevention Services to Reduce Sexual Abuse of Runaway, Homeless, and Street Youth Program) provides "education, treatment, counselling and referrals" for teenage runaways, homeless teenagers, and others living on the streets. Annual funding for the 2015 fiscal year was $17 million, with 101 grantees served.

Although workers to not gather personal information on those served, the program recorded a total of 461,524 instances of contact with young people in the 2014 fiscal year, of which 21,378 moved to a shelter for at least a single night.

== Adolescent Pregnancy Prevention Program ==
The Adolescent Pregnancy Prevention Program supports efforts at reducing rates of teen pregnancy and the transmission of sexually transmitted diseases, with an emphasis on adolescents in foster care, those who are homeless, and those who belong to minority groups. Grant programs include:

- The State Personal Responsibility Education Program, which began in 2010 through an amendment to the Social Security Act, and which in the fiscal year for 2016 dispersed $40.8 million among 50 grantees.
- The Tribal Personal Responsibility Education Program, which in 2016 dispersed $3.4 million among eight grantees
- The Personal Responsibility Education Program Competitive Grants, which in 2015 awarded $10 million to 21 grantees
- The Personal Responsibility Education Innovative Strategies Program, which awards about $9 million annually
- The State Abstinence Education Grant Program, which supports abstinence education, and in the fiscal year for 2016 awarded $60.4 million to 38 states and territories
- The Competitive Abstinence Education Grant Program, which funds initiatives that increase "knowledge of effective and promising approaches to reducing teen pregnancy"

== Family Violence Prevention and Services Program ==
The Family Violence Prevention and Services Program (FVPSP) provides a number of grants to targeted as domestic violence victims along with their families, provides funding for approximately 1,600 emergency shelters, as well as counseling, and a national domestic violence hotline. The FVPSP also provides funding for research into the prevention of family violence, training, and technical assistance to related programs.

Program funding is allocated as follows:

- 70% to states and territories for domestic violence programs
- 10% to tribes for domestic violence programs
- 10% to Domestic Violence Coalitions
- 6% to the National Resource Center on Domestic Violence
- 2.5% for evaluation, monitoring and administration
- 1.5% for discretionary spending

== See also ==
- Youth services
- Foster care in the United States
- Homelessness in the United States
