= Runaway (dependent) =

Child who leaves home without permission of parents or legal guardians

A runaway is a minor or (depending upon the local jurisdiction) a person under a specified age who has left their parents or legal guardians without permission.

== Causes ==
Current studies suggest that the primary cause of youth homelessness is family dysfunction in the form of parental neglect, physical or sexual abuse, family substance use disorder, and family violence. Nearly half of runaway youths report that at least one of their parents struggles with alcohol addiction, and at least one third reported a parent struggling with drug addiction.

Studies also show that 89% of child runaways were encouraged to do so by their peers.

== Consequences of running away ==
Runaways have an elevated risk of destructive behavior. Approximately fifty percent of runaways experience difficulties with schooling, including dropping out, expulsion, or suspension. Running away can increase the risk of delinquency for adolescents, and expose them to the risk of victimization. There have been many studies in multiple countries about "street children"—youth who have run away and are presently homeless—showing that they have a high risk of taking illicit drugs, developing sexually transmitted infections (STIs), unintended pregnancy, depression, suicide attempts, and sexual exploitation. Greater proportions of runaway youths experience clinically significant post-traumatic stress disorder than normative youths. Trauma generally begins with runaway youth's experiences within the family and is increased by prolonged traumatic events. The likelihood of depression among female runaways is typically related to family conflict and communication. Depression in male runaways is typically related to paternal alcohol use disorder and poor family relationships. Negative interactions in relationships within the family appear to greatly influence depressive symptoms for both of these genders.

== Runaways in international contexts ==
=== Hong Kong ===
In Hong Kong, 51.1 percent of at-risk youth identified by social workers have been a runaway during the age range of 11 to 18.

=== India ===
Approximately 47 million runaway and homeless adolescents are estimated to be on the streets of India.

Familial respect is important in India. Much of the Indian runaway population describes themselves as young people doing everything right at home, but having received harsh treatment from family members all throughout life.

=== Mainland China ===
Social control theory describes the runaway situation in China. Adolescent friendships can interfere with positive influences parents place in the adolescent's life. According to the Chinese National Bureau of Statistics, approximately 150,000 runaway children and youth were documented in 2006. Unrealistic expectations of school has caused many adolescents to run away. Many runaways are low achievers who reported they were constantly criticized by their teachers and experienced their teachers indifferent attitude toward them. Overbearing parents' authoritarian, overprotective, and neglectful styles have led to adolescents running away.

=== United States ===
In the United States, a runaway is a minor who leaves home without permission and stays away either overnight (14 years old and younger or older and mentally incompetent) or away from home two nights (15 or over) and chooses not to come home when expected to return. A runaway is different from child abandonment or a "throwaway" youth (a youth who isn't formally abandoned by parents, but is frequently ignored in favor of another sibling). Runaway youth are evenly divided male and female, although girls are more likely to seek help through shelters and hotlines. In the United States, runaway children or youth are widely regarded as a chronic and serious social problem. It is estimated that each year, there are between 1.3 and 1.5 million runaway and homeless youth in the United States According to a 1983 training report on the United States Department of Justice Office of Justice Programs website, a large percentage of runaways in the US leave their home to escape sexual assault.

Running away from home is considered a crime in some jurisdictions, but it is usually a status offense punished with probation, or not punished at all. Giving aid or assistance to a runaway instead of turning them in to the police is a more serious crime called "harboring a runaway", and is typically a misdemeanor. The law can vary considerably from one jurisdiction to another; in the United States, there is a different law in every state. A 2003 FBI study showed that there were 123,581 arrests for runaway youths in the United States.

The Family and Youth Services Bureau of the United States Department of Health and Human Services funds grant programs to help runaway and homeless youth. The organization also provides funding for the National Runaway Switchboard, a national hotline for runaway youth, youth who are thinking about running away, or are in crisis, parents, and other concerned adults.

== Notable runaways ==
- Harold Lowe, British merchant sailor, later famous for being the Fifth Officer aboard the ill-fated RMS Titanic. He ran away from his home in Wales at the age of 15, saying later it was because he wanted to pursue his own career of choice rather than his father's. His decision to leave may also have stemmed, in part, due to his father's alcoholism and their strained relationship.
- Jeff Ott, American guitarist; he was physically and sexually abused as a child and ran away from home at the age of 13, living on the streets for 11 years.
- Leonid Georgievich Belousov, Soviet flying ace who ran away from home at age 13 and became a pupil of the 51st Rifle Division, assisting them during the Russian Civil War.
- Isa Hasan al-Yasiri – (1942), Iraqi-Canadian poet. When he was ten years old, he ran away from school without the knowledge of his family to the village of his maternal uncles. He traveled there with a caravan of camels, walking with them all night long. He stated years later at the age of 74 that he had defined his childhood self-concept based on freedom.

== See also ==
- International Centre for Missing & Exploited Children
- National Runaway Safeline
- Refugee children
- Street children
- Toyoko kids
- Dawn: Portrait of a Teenage Runaway
- Child abandonment – children whose parents remove them from the home or refuse to allow them to live at home
- Disownment – declaring that a child is no longer part of the family
