= Street Medicine Institute =

Street Medicine Institute was formed in 2008 by Dr. Jim Withers. The term Street Medicine, in this context, was coined by Dr. Jim Withers who has been one of the leaders in the movement.
