= Poverello Center =

Non-profit organization in Montana, U.S.

The Poverello Center, Inc. is a 501(c)(3) organization devoted to, advocating for, and providing a multitude of services to address and improve the health, well-being, and stability of the homeless and under-served within Missoula, Montana.

== History ==
On March 18, 1974, four women met at the Knights of Columbus Hall to cook nourishing bread, soup, and coffee for the homeless. For the first several years, the Poverello was run by nuns, though it has since become a secular non-profit organislzation.

Until 1979, the soup kitchen seemed an adequate service. That winter Patrick Todd, Director of the Poverello Center, wrote of the increasing need to shelter people "alone in the night with no place to go." He wrote the poignant story of Humberto Roca, a man of Mexican descent who understood little English. He was on his way to visit his sister but ended up in Missoula, Montana. His difficulty in walking made it apparent that he was suffering from frostbite. A subsequent visit to the local hospital resulted in amputation. The incident fueled Todd's crusade to fill the need for emergency housing. The Poverello Center emergency shelter was opened on November 18, 1981.

In December 2014, the Poverello Center moved from its Ryman Street location to 1110 West Broadway, a location with more room for services and guests. Since 2019, the Poverello Center has staffed a second shelter, funded by the City of Missoula, at the corner of Johnson Street and North Avenue. From 2019 to 2023, the shelter was open seasonally through the winter. However, in fall of 2023, the City approved a contract to keep the Johnson Street shelter ("J Street") open for a year-long period, from September 2023 to September 2024. Future operations of the Johnson Street Shelter remain unknown, as the city has announced plans to rework the property.

The word "poverello" is an Italian word denoting "the poor one", originally in reference to St. Francis of Assisi.

== Programs and services ==
The Poverello Center, Inc. operates five separate programs addressing the diverse needs of the Missoula community. In its Broadway emergency shelter, the "Pov" is often at capacity, sleeping approximately 150 homeless residents a night. Clients who access the emergency shelter, soup kitchen, food pantry, laundry and shower services during day and night hours may be able to do so under the influence barring any behavioral issues. The shelter also works in conjunction with Partnership Health Center to offer a free health clinic to the homeless community.

Through its "Food Programs", The Poverello Center serves over 100,000 hot meals a year at its emergency shelter. A continental breakfast is served from 4 am to 7:30 am daily. A hot lunch and dinner is also served every day. Meals are also served on all major holidays. In addition to the soup kitchen, the shelter also offers a food pantry, grocery rescue program and sack lunch program, feeding thousands of hungry, homeless and low income individuals and families each year.

Clients are homeless and/or working poor individuals, some of whom are disabled, mentally ill, elderly and/or veterans. Some clients also struggle with substance abuse recovery. In order to access services, clients must be over the age of 18.

Direct Care Staff at the Poverello Center also offer supportive services to homeless and impoverished individuals and families 24 hours a day, including bus passes, mail pick-up, obtainment of identification, birth certificates, job and housing placement, local and long-distance calls and more.

The Poverello Center also administers the Veteran's Administration's regional Homeless Veterans Program. Individuals who qualify for this service are offered benefits for enrolling. Until 2023, the Poverello Center staffed both "Housing Montana Heroes", located at the Poverello Center's Broadway building, and the Valor House, located at 2820 Great Northern Loop. The Valor House program provided transitional housing and supportive services for up to 17 homeless veterans, both men and women. Residents were able to remain in the program for up to two years while addressing the necessary steps and goals allowing veterans to secure stable, long-term housing. In late 2023, Valor House became permanent supportive housing, and the Poverello Center staff who worked there moved to ensure their work was in line with the organization's mission. Housing Montana Heroes provides shelter and special privileges for 20 qualifying veterans. This includes case management, community, and access to resources.

Operating out of the Johnson Street shelter but serving all of Missoula, the Homeless Outreach Team seeks to serve and engage the homeless within the wider Missoula community. It provides opportunities for community education on homelessness and constructive approaches for residential and organizational interactions with homeless men and women. Run by five staff members and a rotating team of volunteers, the shelter's H.O.T. also helps distribute toiletries, food and clothing to those who do not regularly seek the shelter's services.

== Board of Directors and staff ==
The Poverello Center consists of a Board of Directors with 13 members of the community. The organization's Executive Director, Jill Bonny oversees all programs, with the help of a Director of Programs and a Programs Manager.

== Statistics ==
Since 1982, over 450,000 shelter nights have been provided to men and women in need of emergency housing. While the first years of providing shelter averaged 5,000 shelter nights a year, the need has grown by over 430% to the rate of 25,763 shelter nights in 2012. In the 39 years the Poverello Center has provided meals to Missoulians in need, over 2.5 million meals have been served − equivalent to 66,000 meals a year.

Along with providing emergency shelter and hot meals to the community of Missoula, the Poverello Center has operated a food pantry since 1982 to further assist households in need.

== Help Build Hope Campaign ==
After decades in an old boarding house in downtown Missoula, the Poverello Center's emergency shelter began their Help Build Hope Campaign to fund the building of a new site for its growing clientele. The recent economic downturn has put new stresses on many of the shelter's neighbors and businesses. When the boarding house on Ryman Street became the Poverello Center in 1981, 4,800 nights of shelter and 15,000 meals were provided yearly. Consequently, the organization is in the process of building a new facility.

Ground broke in October 2013 and the new location was open in December 2014 at 1110 W. Broadway.
