= National Runaway Safeline =

National communications system

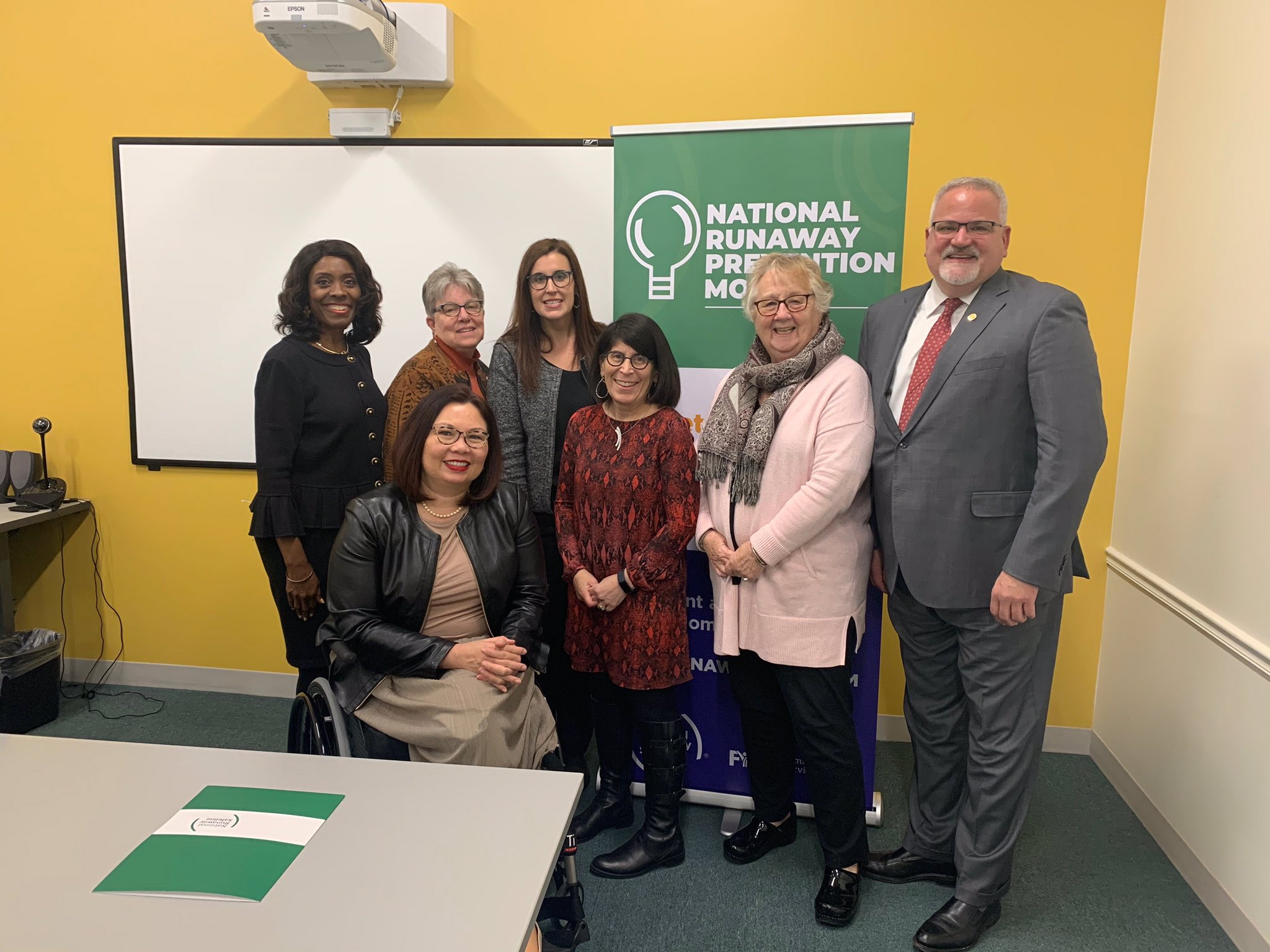
- Senator Tammy Duckworth with staff at the National Runaway Safeline in 2019.
- Founded: 1971
- Type: 24-hour federally designated national communications system
- Purpose: The National Runaway Safeline provides education and solution-focused interventions, offers non-sectarian, non-judgmental support, respects confidentiality, collaborates with volunteers, and responds to at-risk youth and their families 24 hours a day.
- Location: Chicago
- Region served: United States and territories, including Puerto Rico, the U.S. Virgin Islands, and Guam
- Method: free 24-hour services, expertise in all youth-related issues and as an information clearinghouse of youth services.
- Executive Director: Maureen Blaha
- Employees: 25
- Volunteers: 150+
- Website: 1800RUNAWAY.org

The National Runaway Safeline (also known as NRS or 1-800-RUNAWAY; formerly known as the National Runaway Switchboard) is the national communications system designated by the United States federal government for runaway and homeless youth, their parents and families, teens in crisis, and others who might benefit from its services. It is confidential, anonymous, non-judgmental, non-directive, and free. The hotline number is 1-800-RUNAWAY. Calls are answered every day of the year, 24 hours a day.

The National Runaway Switchboard was started in 1974, in Chicago, IL., by the staff of Metro-Help, a 24 hour crisis phone line. Grants from the Playboy Foundation and the Federal Government, H.E.W., provide the funding.
