= Homelessness in the United Kingdom =

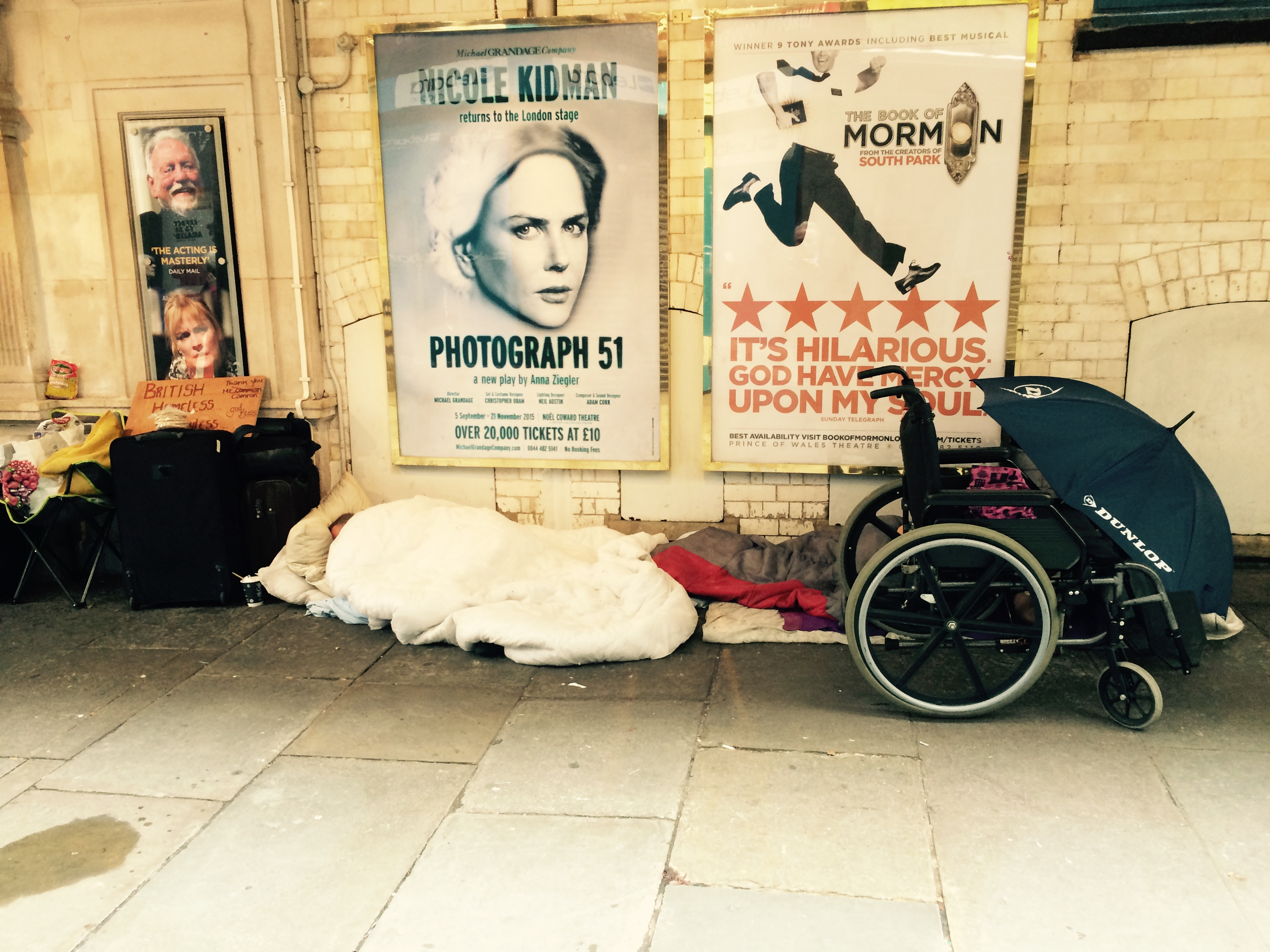
Rough sleeper in London, 2015

Homelessness in the United Kingdom is measured and responded to in differing ways in England, Scotland, Wales and Northern Ireland, but affects people living each of the countries of the United Kingdom. While most homeless people have at least a modicum of shelter, research by the BBC in 2020 suggested that more than 28,000 people in the UK were recorded as sleeping rough in the previous 12 months. In 2024, 1,611 homeless people died in the UK, a record high according to the Museum of Homelessness. This was a 9% increase on the year before, with most deaths linked to suicide or drugs.

== Homeless population of England ==
Homeless charity Shelter estimated in 2024 that the number of people in England who were entirely homeless or in temporary accommodation was 354,000. As of 2026, 134,210 households were living in temporary accommodation. Rough sleepers are only a small proportion of the homeless.

According to figures from the Ministry of Housing, Communities and Local Government, the number of people registered as homeless with local councils was just over 100,000 in 1998, rose to 135,000 in 2003 before declining in the years up to and during the Great Recession. After a low of 40,000 in 2009 and 2010, the figure rose to just under 60,000 in 2017. The number living in temporary accommodation rose from 50,000 in 1998 to 100,000 in 2005, declining back to 50,000 in 2011, then rising to 80,000 in 2017.

The number of rough sleepers was 4,800 in 2017 compared to 1,800 in 2010, when comparable records begin. It reached a new high of 4,793 people estimated to be sleeping out in a single night in autumn 2025, according to government data. Crisis attributes rising homelessness to a shortage of social housing, housing benefits not covering private rents and a shortage of homeless prevention schemes for people leaving care.

Of homeless people who died in 2017, the average age was 44 for men and 42 for women. Suicide, drugs including alcohol, are the most common causes of death among the homeless. There are documented cases of homeless being traumatically crushed by trash compacting machinery when sleeping in disposal bins.

In 2023, the number of homeless people in England hit record levels, with 104,510 people in England in temporary accommodation. By the end of 2025, the number of households in temporary accommodation in England had risen to over 123,000, including more than 159,000 children. An estimated 3,898 people slept rough in England in 2023, over double the estimated figure from 2010.

== History ==
Historically, support for people who became homeless was provided by monastic communities. After the Reformation, forms of support through early local government structures were provided by means of the poor law, which differed in England and Wales, Scotland, and Ireland.

Eventually, a system of formally elected local authorities replaced the poor law unions. The current system of local authority housing and homelessness assistance in England, was introduced by the Housing (Homeless Persons) Act 1977 and is currently overseen through the Housing Act 1996.

=== Penny sit-up ===
The penny sit-up was one of the first homeless shelters in central London created for the people of Blackfriars. It was established during the late nineteenth and early twentieth centuries. The shelter was operated by The Salvation Army to provide support to destitute people. What made this shelter unique was that in exchange for a penny, people would be allowed to sit on a bench in a reasonably warm room all night. They were not allowed to lie down and sleep on the bench. In another charitable hostel in Preston, Lancashire in 1910, the Penny Sit-Up was described as "a penny is paid for entrance, and the men spend their nights lying on the bare floor, or sitting against the wall. There are no bunks or beds of any sort, only wooden kneelers for pillows; there is no stove". Another description in the same year says that "In Preston there is "the Penny Sit-up," or as Mr. Edwards prefers to call it, " The House of Despair." ... The room is literally bare. No fireplace, no stove hot water pipes, no sink, no water, no beds, chairs, blankets, no mattresses — nothing whatever for the furnishing of the room except small, very small oil lamp, very dimly lighted, and four long wooden kneelers about two inches off the floor sloping upwards towards the back. These are wooden pillows, and presently the floor of this room will be covered with bodies lying feet to feet in two double rows down the length of the room."

A penny sit-up was the cheapest homeless shelter at that time. There were more expensive shelters available in London, such as a "four penny coffin", where the clients were provided with a coffin-sized box so that they could sleep lying-down, and a "two-penny hangover", in which clients were allowed to sleep on a bench in an upright position, with a rope to stop them falling over when as they slept.

By 1912, the Salvation Army's Penny Sit-Up in Blackfriars had been closed.

By today's standards, the penny sit-up would be considered inadequate and callous. However, at the time it was considered a well-meaning, inexpensive, and compassionate attempt to deal with the recent explosion in homelessness caused by the rapid urbanisation of 19th century England. The Salvation Army believed these shelters provided relief from the harsh London winters and provided new followers of Christianity. Others, such as Professor Howard Sercombe of the University of Strathclyde, have argued that such institutions were more likely to have been designed to control the homeless, or at the very best were a compassionate response to the harsh "moving on" laws of the time, which made it illegal for people to remain vagrant upon the streets.

=== Four penny coffin ===
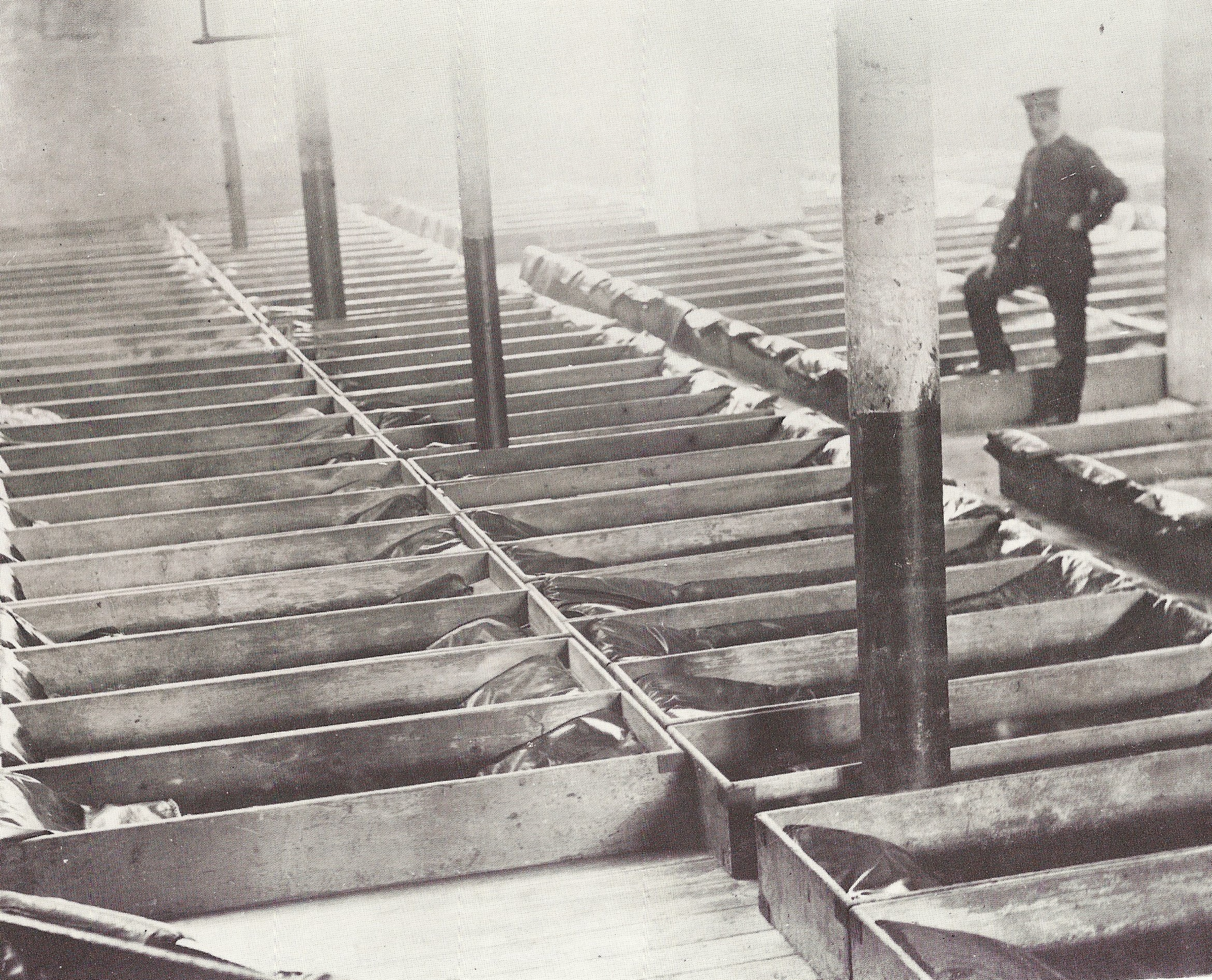
These rows of "coffins" were the men's sleeping quarters in London's Burne Street hostel. Circa 1900.

The four penny coffin or coffin house was one of the first homeless shelters created for the people of central London. It was operated by the Salvation Army during the late 19th and early 20th centuries to provide comfort and aid to its destitute clients.

For four pennies (equivalent to approx. £5.20 in 2026), a homeless client could stay at a coffin house. He received food and shelter. Moreover, he was allowed to lie down flat on his back and sleep in a coffin-shaped wooden box. The client was given a tarpaulin for covering. What made this unique is that it was the cheapest homeless shelter in London at that time that allowed its clients to lie down on their back and sleep. The Salvation Army also offered shelters that allowed its clients to sleep on a bed for a much higher price. Hence, the coffin house was popular because it offered an economical and mid-range solution for homeless clients looking for relief from the cold.

== Causes of homelessness ==
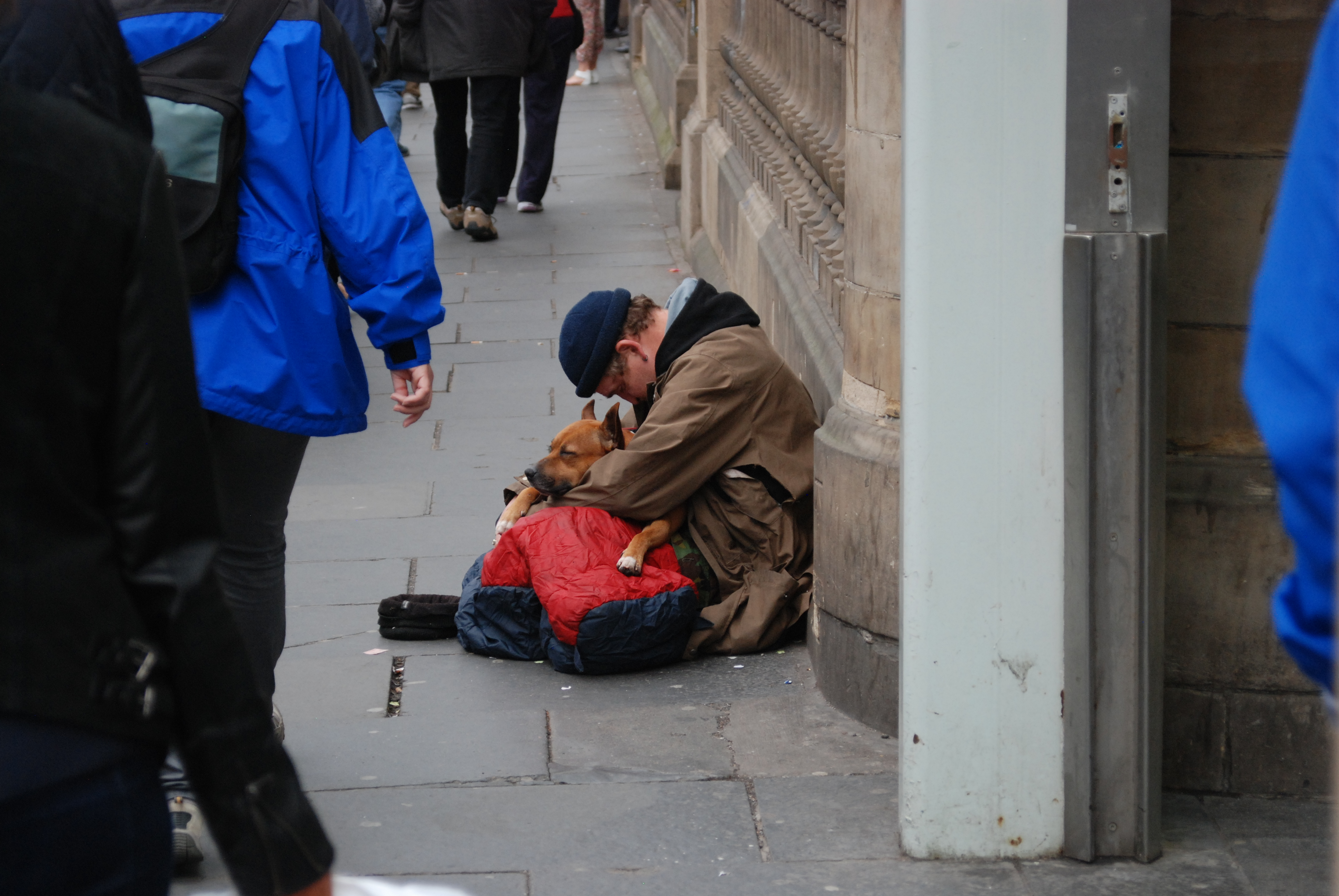
A homeless man near Princes Street in Edinburgh

A systems-wide evaluation conducted by the Centre for Homelessness Impact, with RSM and Cordis Bright, for the Ministry of Housing, Communities and Local Government found that rises in rough sleeping and other forms of homelessness have been driven by complex structural pressures, rather than being the fault of individuals affected.

Some of the main causes of homelessness in the UK include:

- Housing insecurity (e.g. being unable to afford the rent)
- Lack of affordable housing
- Inadequate housing benefit
- Poverty
- Unemployment
- Leaving prison, care or the army with no home to go to
- Relationship breakdown
- Mental health problem
- Physical health problem
- Substance misuse

Certain people can find it harder to rent and are at an increased risk of homelessness. These people include: those facing discrimination (i.e. because of their ethnicity, sex, gender or disability), a lone parent, refugees, those experiencing domestic abuse, those receiving benefits, and those leaving prison, the care system or the armed forces.

A 2026 study suggests that problem debt can be a systemic driver of homelessness. It highlights how debt can accumulate through rent arrears, utility bills and Council Tax debt, increasing the likelihood of eviction and housing insecurity.

The longer term causes of homelessness have been examined by a number of research studies. A number of different pathways into homelessness have been identified; research suggests that both personal factors (e.g. addictions) and structural factors (e.g. poverty) are ultimately responsible for the sequence of events that results in homelessness. For young people, there are additional factors that appear to be involved, most notably needing to face the responsibilities of independent living before they are ready for them. Rising costs of housing and increases in job insecurity have also been identified as contributing factors.

Tim Renshaw, chief executive of the Archer Project stated in October 2025,

"We have one of the worst systems in terms of making housing available to the poorest. We are looking at homelessness being related to health factors - trauma, depression, anxiety. And we've increasing levels of poverty."

== Government assistance ==
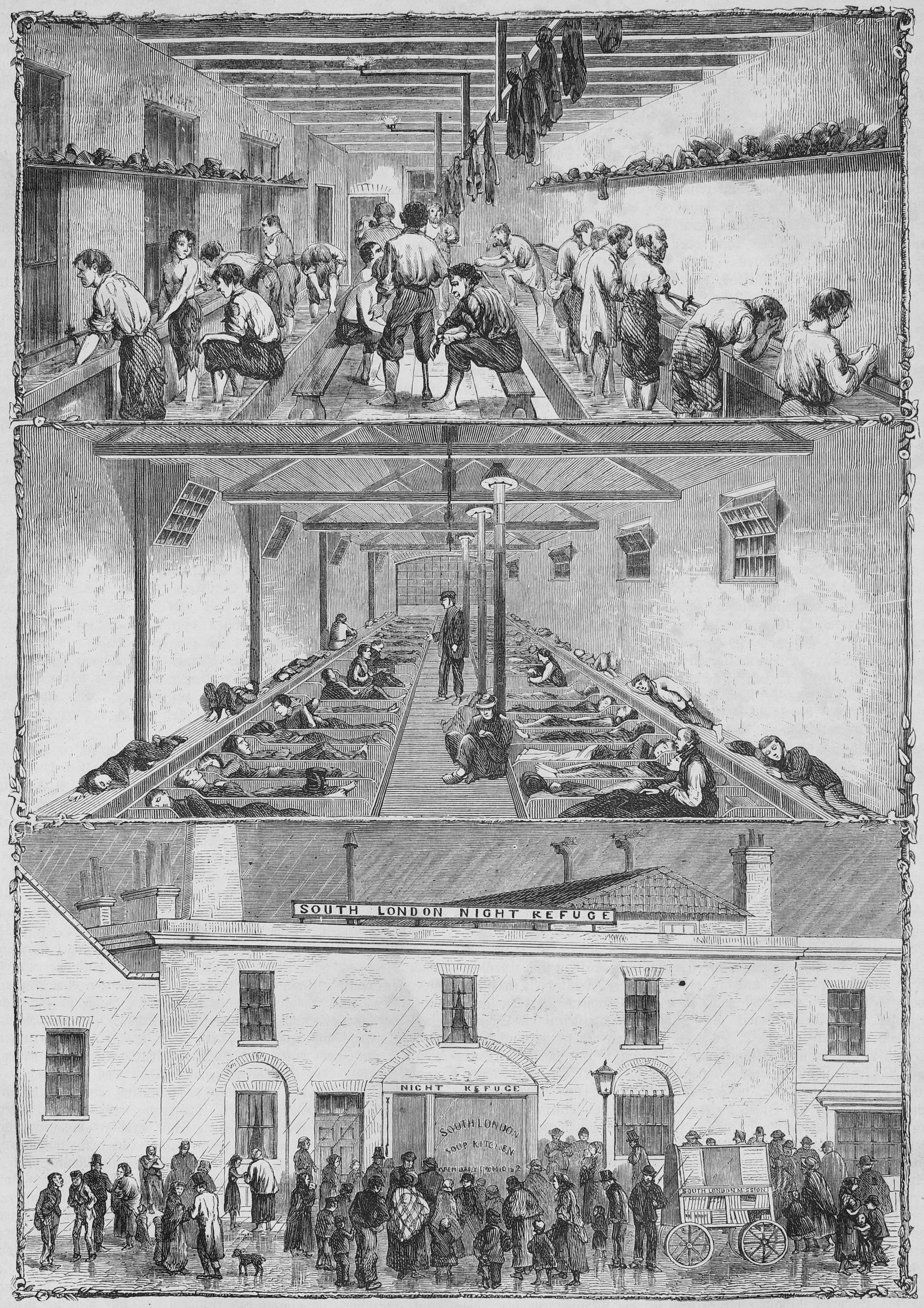
Homeless shelter in London, 1866

Policy on homelessness is overseen by the Ministry of Housing, Communities and Local Government and Homes and Communities Agency in England, the Scottish Government Communities Directorate in Scotland, the Welsh Government, and the Department for Communities and Northern Ireland Housing Executive in Northern Ireland. It has been a devolved policy area outside England since the introduction of devolution in the 1990s. Scotland has a dedicated Minister for Housing who is a junior minister of the Scottish Government, who has direct responsibility for homelessness and rough sleeping, government policy on housing and debt advice.

The Grenfell Tower fire in June 2017 focused national attention on homelessness and housing quality, and resulted in around 255 people becoming homeless overnight. It was reported in The Guardian in 2018 that half of young people at risk of homelessness in the UK who approached their local authority, received no significant help.

All Local Housing Authorities (LHAs) in the United Kingdom have a legal statutory duty to provide 24-hour advice to homeless people, or those who are at risk of becoming homeless within 28 days. Once an individual applies to the appropriate City Council, Borough Council, District Council or Unitary Authority for assistance, from a person claiming to be homeless (or threatened with homelessness), the Local Housing Authority is also legally duty bound to make detailed inquiries into that person's circumstances, in order to decide whether they meet the criteria, which are defined as statutory homelessness. For people meeting such criteria, the Local Housing Authority therefore has a legal statutory duty to find Temporary Accommodation for the person, and then provide them with assistance to find a permanent, long term adequate dwelling, that will usually be within the Private Rented Sector (PRS), but sometimes will be a property with a Housing Association, a council house, or a council flat.

=== Statutory homelessness ===
==== Definition ====
A person suffers statutory homelessness if governmental regulations oblige the council to provide housing-related support to the person. At present this criterion is met if (and only if) all of the following conditions are true:

- they do not have a permanent home
- the person is not prevented from accessing UK public funds by immigration laws
- the person has a local connection to the local authority's area (this could, for example, be the residential presence of family, friends, or previous residence of the person themselves)
- the person unintentionally became homeless (this does not include eviction for non-payment of rent, if they could afford to pay it)
- the person is in priority need; this condition has been abolished in Scotland since the start of 2013, and there are campaigns for it to be abolished in the rest of the UK.

The definition of priority need varies between England, Scotland, Wales, and Northern Ireland, but generally includes any of following conditions being met:

- pregnancy
- a dependant child
- an age of 16–17
- aged 18–20 and leaving local authority care
- vulnerability due to
  - old age, or
  - mental illness, or
  - mental/physical disability
  - leaving the armed forces
  - leaving prison
- fleeing, or at the risk of, domestic violence
- homelessness due to an emergency (such as flood, fire, or other disaster)

A person does not have to be roofless to legally qualify as lacking a permanent home. They may be in possession of accommodation which it is not reasonably feasible to continue to use by virtue of its affordability, condition, or location. The requirement to have a local connection does not apply if it would lead to the applicant becoming a victim of violence, or at risk of violence.

In Wales, priority need was similarly extended to include individuals who are aged 18 to 20 and at risk of financial or sexual exploitation, but provided they are leaving care.

==== Consequences ====
Temporary accommodation must be provided to those that might be suffering statutory homelessness, pending a final decision. Often bed and breakfast hotels are used for temporary accommodation, unless a suitable hostel or refuge is available. The suitability of temporary accommodation is often a topic of concern for local media, and pressure groups.

If the council concludes that the applicant suffers statutory homelessness then the local authority has a legal duty to find long-term accommodation for the applicant and their household (those dependants who would ordinarily be living with them), and any other person whom it is reasonable to expect to reside with them. The council must offer/continue to provide temporary accommodation to such an applicant, on an immediate basis, until long-term accommodation is found for them.

Long-term accommodation may not necessarily be a socially rented home (one provided by the council, or by a Housing Association); the council can discharge its duty by finding an appropriate private sector tenancy for the applicant.

=== Non-statutory homelessness ===
If the authority decides that a person does lack a home, but does not qualify as suffering statutory homelessness, then a lesser obligation applies.

Where the applicant merely lacks a local connection to the council, the council will usually refer the applicant's case to a local authority with which they do have a local connection. If the applicant is in priority need, but is considered to have become homeless intentionally, the local authority is obliged to provide temporary accommodation for as long as is reasonably necessary for the applicant to find long-term accommodation; this is usually a fortnight, but additional periods of similar length can sometimes be provided at the council's discretion which are typically granted in cases of extenuating circumstances.

== Rough sleeping in England ==
A national service, called Streetlink, was established in 2012 to help members of the public obtain near-immediate assistance for specific rough sleepers, with the support of the Government (as housing is a devolved matter, the service currently only extends to England). Currently, the service doesn't operate on a statutory basis, and the involvement of local authorities is merely due to political pressure from the government and charities, with funding being provided by the government (and others) on an ad-hoc basis. The UK government has cut funding to local authorities, and local authorities feel forced to reduce services for people experiencing homelessness. It is feared this will increase the numbers of rough sleepers and increase the numbers dying while sleeping rough.

A member of the public who is concerned that someone is sleeping on the streets can report the individual's details via the Street Link website or by calling its hotline. Someone who finds themselves sleeping on the streets can also report their situation using the same methods.

The service aims to respond within 24 hours, including an assessment of the individual circumstances and an offer of temporary accommodation for the following nights. The response typically includes a visit to the rough sleeper early in the morning that follows the day or night on which the report has been made. The service operates via a number of charities and with the assistance of local councils.

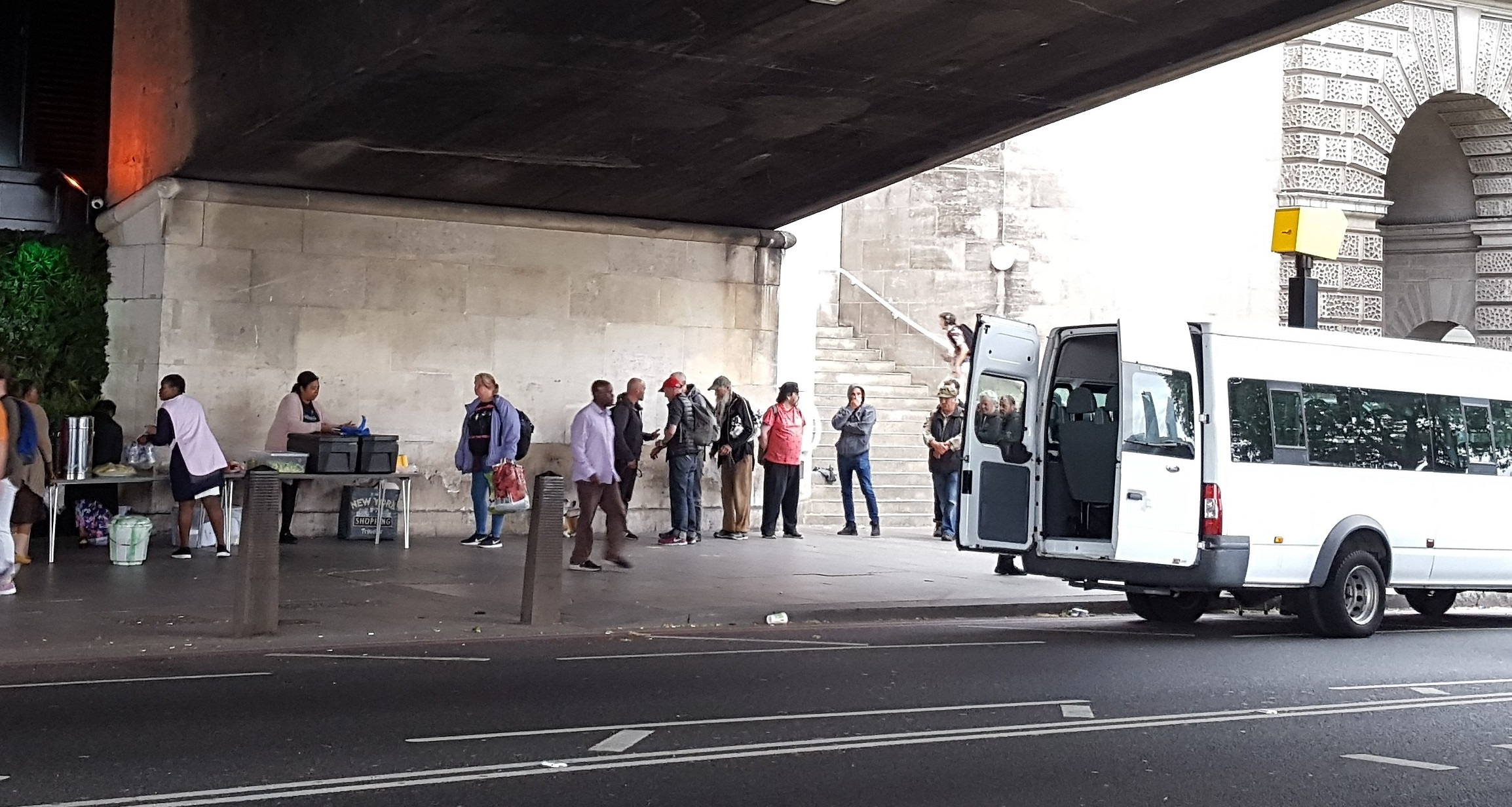
Soup Run provided by a charity

Where appropriate, rough sleepers will also be offered specialist support:

- if they have substance misuse issues, they will be referred for support from organisations such as St. Mungo's (despite the name, this is a non-religious charity)
- if they are foreign nationals with no right to access public funds in the UK, repatriation assistance will be offered, including finding accommodation in the home country, construction of support plans, and financial assistance.

Other organisations, like The Connection at St. Martin's, address a range of complex needs. This is because many people sleeping rough struggle with multiple complex needs like addiction, poor mental health or unclear immigration status.

It was reported in 2018 that at least 50 local authorities had enacted Public Space Protection Orders to deter begging in town centres. Liberty has argued that these ordinances are illegal and that people experiencing homelessness often lack the access to the legal aid support needed to challenge them.

== Deaths ==
Data from the Office of National Statistics states the average age of death for those experiencing homelessness in England and Wales is 45 for men and 43 for women. and that homeless people are over nine times more likely to take their own life than the general population.

== Prevention ==
To prevent homelessness the charity Crisis maintains the public sector should:

- Build 100,500 social homes a year to address the needs of people experiencing homelessness and those on low income.
- Introduce Housing First nationally providing homes and specialised support for people experiencing homelessness.
- Improve rights for private renters and improve housing benefit.
- The care system, hospitals, prisons should be legally required to help find homes for those leaving their care.
- There should be homelessness specialists at Job Centres.

=== Non-government assistance ===
Practical advice regarding homelessness can be obtained through a number of major non-governmental organisations including,

- Citizens Advice Bureaus and some other charities also offer free legal advice in person, by telephone, or by email, from qualified lawyers and others operating on a pro bono basis
- Shelter provides extensive advice about homelessness and other housing problems on their website, and from the telephone number given there, including about rights and legal situations.
- Alabaré is a homeless charity that supports over 3,000 people through its extensive network of homes, drop-in centres, and specialised support services. Its goal is to end homelessness, help people regain stability, improve their wellbeing and build bright, independent futures.

== See also ==
- 2021–present United Kingdom cost-of-living crisis
- Affordability of housing in the United Kingdom
- Deinstitutionalisation
- Homelessness in England
- Homelessness in Scotland
- Homelessness in Wales
- Housing in the United Kingdom
- Hunger in the United Kingdom
- Income in the United Kingdom
- Lippiatt v Electoral Registration Officer, Penwith District Council
- Mental health in the United Kingdom
- Museum of Homelessness
- Post-traumatic stress disorder
- Poverty in the United Kingdom
- Simon Community
- The Big Issue
- United Kingdom government austerity programme
