= Museum of Homelessness =

Museum in London, England

- Established: 2014
- Location: London, England
- Type: Social History Museum
- Website: www.museumofhomelessness.org

The Museum of Homelessness (abbreviated to MoH) is a museum, based in London, created and run by people with direct experience of homelessness.

The museum was established in 2014 by husband and wife team Matt and Jess Turtle. MoH operates broadly across four main areas: building a national collection of homelessness for the UK; direct and practical action in support of its community (including operating a Severe Weather Emergency Shelter); independent research and campaigning (including the Dying Homeless Project and Severe Weather Emergency publication); and public education through exhibitions and events.

== History ==
MoH has and maintains close links with the Simon Community, a London-based homelessness charity that influenced the emergence of many large homelessness charities today such as St Mungo's, Centrepoint, and Crisis. MoH collaborates with the Simon Community's historical archive and cooperates on frontline work with people affected by homelessness in London. This and the rising homelessness of the last decade provided the early momentum for setting up the museum. As well as securing agreement from the Community to use the archive in its programme in London, Matt and Jess Turtle formed a core group of volunteers who had experience of homelessness to meet to review and plan the museum's work. Early impetus for the project was supported by a research grant from King's Cultural Institute and a joint effort with the homelessness charity Groundswell, with the project becoming a charity in October 2015.

One of MoH's co-founders, Jess Turtle, was born into a grassroots community of homeless people set up by her parents Fred Josef and Jane Josef (now Rothery) in 1978. The community they lived in was named The Wallich-Clifford community, now The Wallich, after Anton Wallich-Clifford, the Simon Community founder. Wallich-Clifford and Fred Josef had come to know each other well in London in the 1960s when Josef was rough sleeping and Wallich-Clifford was his probation officer. Josef played an important role in the early days of the Simon Community and went on to set up his own project in Cardiff. This upbringing has informed the founding of MoH and the way that the museum sets out to work with people based on community principles. In addition, Jane Rothery, co-founder of The Wallich was the founding Chair of Trustees for MoH.

=== Launch Years (2017–2018) ===
After their first early projects, the core group were offered the opportunity to participate in a programme run by Tate called ‘Tate Exchange’. The group launched State of the Nation as a launch weekender in April 2017. State of the Nation involved many contributing organisations and people, and was designed to provide a snapshot of the homelessness crisis in 2017. Important collaborations included teaming up with formerly homeless artist David Tovey to stage Man on Bench, a performance fashion show at Tate Modern. MoH also developed a long-standing collaboration with artist Anthony Luvera to stage his and Gerald McLaverty's project Frequently Asked Questions.

A tour of London's hostels followed in partnership with Cardboard Citizens as the State of the Nation programme continued throughout 2017 and was taken on the road to Liverpool in early 2018. MoH was strengthened in this period by the appointment of Sharon Heal, Director of the Museums Association as chair.

During this time MoH began to collect objects and interview testimony from different around the UK to reflect a range of opinions and experiences about homelessness. MoH works to address potentially damaging representations of homelessness and does not use fundraising imagery depicting homelessness. The testimony used in these interviews is shared with people through the form of a ‘verbatim’ performance in different settings. A major staging of object stories took place in late 2018 with the Objectified project, a collaborative project exploring neuroscience, health and homelessness that was staged in Manchester that also became the subject of the docudrama made by Dorothy Allen-Pickard and hosted by The Guardian newspaper.

=== Campaigning and social justice work (2018–2019) ===
MoH is independent and does not take government contracts, developing close links with grassroots homelessness and housing groups such as the Outside Project and Streets Kitchen. In early 2019, the charity announced its intention to find a permanent museum space and in Spring 2019 was based at the Outside Project's community centre and shelter at Clerkenwell Fire Station. MoH teamed up with groups at the Fire Station to launch Truths of the Last 10 Years in late 2019, reflecting on a decade of rising homelessness.

The charity is outspoken about social issues related to homelessness and has campaigned on the matter. In 2019, it inherited the Dying Homeless Project, an 18-month investigation launched by the Bureau of Investigative Journalism. MoH worked with lead journalist Maeve McClenaghan in 2019 on the handover. Today, MoH holds a national memorial page for people who have died homeless in the UK and has continued to campaign around the deaths of homeless people. The charity was named as a 2020 Big Issue change-maker in recognition of its work.

Before this, MoH also launched Catalyst, a creative campaigning project funded by the Paul Hamlyn Foundation that brought many new people with experience of homelessness into the organisation. MoH has since worked with high-profile campaigners and artists such as Paul Atherton, gobscure, and Bekki Perriman. In October 2017, the MoH and the Bureau of Investigative Journalism launched Dying Homeless project, a project for data collection regards to homeless deaths promoted by the All Party Parliamentary Group on Homelessness and managed in collaboration with the Office for National Statistics.

=== COVID-19 response (2020–present) ===
As lockdown in the UK began, MoH teamed up with Streets Kitchen, the Outside Project, Simon Community, and the Union Chapel to launch the COVID-19 Homeless Taskforce. Working with Islington Council, the taskforce borrowed the Popham and Cumming community centre, dispatching 8956 meals and care packs across Islington and Camden over a 3-month period. Working with Streets Kitchen, MoH also launched a plan to enable people who are homeless to self-isolate during this period, providing much of the early impetus for the later ‘Everyone In’ programme that saw the Government house thousands of homeless people during the pandemic. As a result of this work, MoH was shortlisted for the Award for Civic Arts Organisations by the Calouste Gulbenkian Foundation.

After the taskforce was asked to hand the Centre back to Islington Council, it continued to operate in North London through its weekly Streetmuseum showcase on Highbury Corner. MoH also teamed up with the Simon Community in late October 2020 to support their street work in Westminster after a second national lockdown was announced. As of May 2024, MoH is permanently based at The Manor House Lodge in Finsbury Park, and during open season continues to share object stories from its collection.

== Research and academic work ==
MoH's social justice approach has been featured in debates and academic work that explores the role of museums in the 21st century. This includes citations in Richard Sandell and Robert R. Janes Museum Activism reader published by Routledge in 2019. Co-founders Matt and Jess Turtle have also contributed to a more recent Routledge volume on museums Museums and Social Change: Challenging the Unhelpful Museum.' They also contributed to 2019 proceedings of the Network of European Museums organisational conference in the same year. Most recently, their work was selected as a case study in the Museums Association manifesto for learning and engagement.

== See also ==
- Homelessness in England
- Homelessness in the United Kingdom
- National Public Housing Museum
