= Delores P. Aldridge =

American sociologist (born 1941)

- Born: Delores Patricia Aldridge; June 8, 1941 (age 85); Tampa, Florida, U.S.
- Spouse: Kwame Essuon
- Children: 2
- Awards: 100+

Academic background
- Education: Clark College (B.A.); Atlanta University (M.A.); University College Dublin (GrDip); Purdue University (Ph.D); University of Ghana, Legon; Georgetown University
- Thesis: Alienation of Self-Esteem of College Students as Related to Socio-Economic Background, Race, and College Experiences (1971)
- Influences: W.E.B. Du Bois; Anna Julia Cooper; Frantz Fanon; Angela Davis

Academic work
- Discipline: Sociology; African-American Studies; Gender Studies
- Sub-discipline: Africana Studies; Social theory; Multiculturalism
- School or tradition: American pragmatism; Black feminism; feminist sociology
- Institutions: Emory University
- Notable works: Out of the Revolution: The Development of Africana Studies (2000)
- Notable ideas: Africana womanism

Delores P. Aldridge (born June 8, 1941) is an American sociologist. Aldridge was the first African-American faculty member at Emory University, and the founder of the first African American and African studies program in the American south.

== Early life and education ==
Aldridge was born on June 8, 1941, in Tampa, Florida, to Willie Lee Aldridge and Mary Ellen Bennett Aldridge. She was privately schooled at Allen Temple A.M.E Church, and then attended Meacham Elementary School, Booker T. Washington Junior High School, and Middleton High School. In 1959, she was the valedictorian of Middleton High School.

Aldridge attended Clark College in Atlanta, Georgia, where she graduated with a Bachelor of Science degree in sociology and Spanish. In 1966, she went on to Atlanta University and received a master's degree in social work. She earned a certificate in child psychology from University College Dublin in 1967. In 1968, Aldridge studied techniques for the treatment of families at the University of Montreal. In 1971, Aldridge earned a Ph.D. in sociology from Purdue University. She was the first African American woman to receive a Ph.D. from the program. In 1972, she studied African politics and art at the University of Ghana at Legon. In 1979, Aldridge completed her postgraduate study at Georgetown University.

== Career ==
Aldridge became a faculty member at Emory University in 1971. She was the first tenure-track African American faculty member at the institution. In 1971, she went on to found the first African American and African studies program, then called the Black Studies Program, in the southern United States. She was a member of Clark College's board of trustees. In 1988, she became a member of Clark Atlanta University's board of trustees after the university was founded. She was the director of the program until 1990. Aldridge additionally served as the president of the National Council for Black Studies for two terms and acted as a board chairman for the International Black Women's Congress (IBWC). During her time with the IBWC, she organized conferences regarding health issues prevalent within African female communities. In 1998 and 1992, Aldridge studied issues of gender and race abroad in the Soviet Union and Brazil. Aldridge was the first professor at any major university to receive a chair that was named for an African American woman's honor. She has published over 150 articles and books. As of 2014, Aldridge is the Board Secretary and Chair of the Academic Affairs committee at Clark Atlanta University.

== Awards ==
Aldridge served as president of the National Council of Black Studies for two terms. She also served as president of the Association of Social and Behavioral Sciences. This association also awarded her the W.E.B Du Bois Award thanks to her scholarship. She also was chairman of the board of the International Black Women's Congress, where she organized international conferences aimed at discussing issues related to African women's health. She has received over one hundred awards. Aldridge received the Great Teachers of the Century award from Emory University. From the Association of Black Sociologists, she received the A. Wade Smith Award for Teaching, Mentoring and Service. In 2006, Aldridge received the Charles S. Johnson Award from the Southern Sociological Society.

Aldridge has also consulted for more than ninety governments, many major national and international universities, foundations, and corporations. Additionally, she co-chaired the 30th Anniversary Celebration of the Civil Rights Movement in Atlanta.

Awards have been named in Aldridge's honor. In 2003, Emory University began the Delores P. Aldridge Excellence Award. This award recognize students that have committed themselves to diversity. In 2004, Clark Atlanta University began the Clark Atlanta University Graduate Research Award. Clark Atlanta University also bestows the Aldridge/McMillan Awards for Excellence.

== Books ==
- A Decade of Struggle: Options for the Future (1981)
- Black Male-Female Relationships: A Resource Book of Selected Materials (1989)
- Focusing: Black Male-Female Relationships (1991)
- Leadership for Diversity: The Role of African American Studies in a Multicultural World (1994)
- River of Tears: The Politics of Black Women's Health (1993), with La Francis Rodgers-Rose
- Out of the Revolution: The development of Africana studies, with Carlene Young (2000)
- Black Cultures and Race Relations (2002), with James E. Conyers
- Africana Studies: Philosophical Perspectives and Theoretical Paradigms, with E Lincoln James (2007)
- Our Last Hope: Black Male-Female Relationships in Change (2008)
- Imagine a World: Pioneering Black Women Sociologists (2009)
- An Intellectual Biography of W.E.B. DuBois, Initiator of Black Studies in the University, with Nagueyalti Warren (2010)
