= NowMedical =

English medical assessment company

- Founded: 2004
- Founder: John W. Keen
- Website: www.nowmedical.co.uk

NowMedical is a London company that reviews medical cases to advise local councils and the Home Office on whether someone qualifies for long-term support under the UK Homeless Code of Guidance.

The councils evaluate whether the person is intentionally homeless, their links to the local area, and whether they are significantly more vulnerable than an ordinary person would be if they became homeless. The councils also evaluate physical disability, mental health issues, and whether the individuals are elderly, fleeing domestic abuse or have been in care or the military.

NowMedical offers advice, but the final decision rests on the local council.

== History ==
NowMedical was founded in 2004 by John W. Keen, whose background is as a general medical practitioner.

Local housing authorities have increased their use of NowMedical over the last 20 years. Bracknell Forest Council was one of more than 100 councils in December 2019 using the company, providing the council with 44 assessments during 2019.

From 2016 to 2019, NowMedical advised Islington Council on more than 6,000 cases. They were paid £17,525 in the 12 months to November 2018. In January 2020 it was reported that the council would stop using the service because of concerns about outsourced medical assessments. NowMedical replied to these concerns that they "[do] not and cannot make any decision on behalf of a local authority".

== Criticisms and controversies ==
In 2015. NowMedical was criticised for providing medical opinions to councils without seeing the people or the medical records of those whose health they assess, thereby "providing secondhand evidence" to the councils. The Liberal Democrat MP Christine Jardine said that there should be "a review of how companies like NowMedical are awarded contracts to make these kinds of assessments."

In November 2019 Keen advised that a woman who was housebound after having a stroke was able to return to Sudan on a plane, recommending frequent exercise whilst on board the plane by walking around the cabin.

Thanet District Council defended its use of the company in 2019, stating that "their role is to assess whether someone’s housing conditions impact on their health. They are not there to replace the services provided by the NHS and people should visit their own GP to discuss their health and medication."

=== Criticisms by courts ===
In 2017, it was criticised by the County Court at Central London for its advice to Lambeth Council, stating that "[NowMedical’s] approach to reaching a conclusion was flawed as a means of providing information that would help the decision maker".

In 2017, NowMedical provided a medical opinion to Haringey Council relating to a mother having to care after a child with autism. The case concerned the suitability of accommodation provided to her and her family, and specifically the potential risk to the child stemming from the flat being situated on the first floor with access to balconies. Keen stated that the optimum solution would be a ground-floor property, however "given a fall from a first floor is unlikely to be fatal, and that availability of ground floor properties may be so scarce as to potentially delay a relocation, then I think that a first floor property is an acceptable alternative." This advice was commented on by the High Court in 2018, which stated that it was "not clear on which medical basis he comes to [his] conclusion".
