= George S. Middleton High School =

American public high school

Middleton High School

Location
- 4801 North 22nd Street; Tampa, (Hillsborough County), Florida 33610; United States; 27.98985°N 82.43351°W

Information
- Type: Public high school
- Motto: Where Family Comes First
- Opened: 1934; 2002 (reopened)
- Status: Open
- School district: Hillsborough County Public Schools
- Superintendent: Addison Davis
- Principal: Camilla Burton
- Teaching staff: 73.00 (FTE)
- Grades: 9–12
- Age: 13 to 19
- Enrollment: 1,511 (2022–23)
- Average class size: ~25
- Student to teacher ratio: 20.70
- Colours: Maroon, Gold and White
- Mascot: Tigers
- Team name: Tigers
- Rival: Howard W. Blake High School
- Website: www.hillsboroughschools.org/o/middleton

Middleton High School is a public high school in Tampa, Florida, named in honor of George S. Middleton, an African-American mail carrier, businessman and civic leader who moved to Tampa from South Carolina in the late 19th century. Middleton was established for black students in 1934 during the segregation era. The current facility opened in 2002 on North 22nd Street in East Tampa.

Middleton's mascot is the Tiger. Its rival school in Hillsborough County is Howard W. Blake High School. A historical marker recounts the school's history. It was an all-black school for nearly 40 years and remains predominantly black along with its surrounding neighborhood. It became a junior high school in 1971.

Middleton High School reopened in a new location in 2002 with community support. In 2008, a report recounted the school's struggles to improve academic achievement.

== History ==
Middleton High School was the first high school for African-Americans in Hillsborough County when it opened in 1934 on 24th and Chelsea Streets in East Tampa. Booker T. Washington School in Tampa had previously accommodated junior and senior high students. George S. Middleton was one of the founders of Central Life Insurance Company of Florida and served as its secretary.

A 1940 fire destroyed the school and it was rebuilt through the Works Progress Administration (WPA). There was a second fire in 1968.

Middleton closed in 1971 as desegregation was being implemented, becoming Middleton Junior High School, and was renamed A.J. Ferrell Middle School of Technology in 2000. After an alumni campaign to reopen the high school, it reopened in 2002 in a new location.

== Academic Performance ==
=== Graduation rate ===
In 2012 Middleton's graduation rate was 59% as compared to a statewide rate of 74.5% and a Hillsborough County rate of 72.6%. As of 2025, the school increased its graduation rate to 99.9% as compared to the state average of 82%.

=== Florida Department of Education grade ===
- 2018 - B
- 2017 - C
- 2016 - C
- 2015 - C
- 2014 - C
- 2013 - C
- 2012 - B
- 2011 - D
- 2010 - C
- 2009 - D
- 2008 - D

FSA performance

During the 2009 school year, only 25% of students scored "proficient" on the reading section of the Florida Standards Assessment, while 53% passed Mathematics and 90% passed Writing. The average among the Hillsborough County School District (SDHC) is 61% for Reading, 68% for Mathematics, and 96% for Writing.

SAT performance

In 2014 Middleton had an average SAT score of 1245.

AP performance

Middleton High School puts a strong emphasis on taking AP level classes, especially for students in the magnet program. In 2016, Middleton had an AP course participation rate of 48%, compared to the state average of 23%, with every student enrolled in any of the magnet programs being required to take at least one AP class every year.

== Magnet programs ==
The magnet school programs at Middleton High School are designed to help students enter career paths in science, technology, engineering, and mathematics. The objective is to give students a balanced and rigorous curriculum leading directly to industry, technical school, or university training. Students take science, mathematics, and technical classes leading to college credit through Advanced Placement, Dual enrollment, and/or articulated agreements. Middleton graduates have computer experience and take elective classes in fine art, performing arts, business, and journalism, in addition to participating in clubs and organizations.

Magnet students at Middleton choose one magnet program for their major, but are encouraged to explore classes in other magnet programs that may be of interest to them. Magnet students may complete more than one magnet program, although they are only required to complete their major. Taking online classes with Florida Virtual School is recommended so that students can complete all their required and elective classes by graduation.

The school offers magnet programs in Biomedicine, Computer Systems Technology, Computer Game Design, and Engineering. Both biomedicine and engineering are Project Lead the Way programs.

=== Engineering ===
The engineering program is based on the Project Lead the Way (PLTW) model, a nationally recognized high school pre-engineering curriculum.

After completing Middleton's Engineering Magnet Pathway, students are prepared for the rigors of engineering courses at the university level.

Middleton is a certified PLTW high school, which means students can earn college credit for their engineering classes at PLTW engineering universities, such as Purdue and Duke.

=== Game design ===
The Academy of Computer Game Design prepares students for video game design and animation. Students practice skills in programming, graphic design, management, and 3D modeling. Creating games includes the building and management of complex databases.

Students receive hands-on experience in planning and building their own original games. Games can be designed to play on multiple platforms such as personal computer, cellphone, Nintendo DS, and Xbox 360.

Students are educated with the foundational knowledge to pursue further training and a career in game design and animation. They may earn industry certifications, such as MOS (Microsoft Office Specialist), Adobe Certified Associate-Photoshop, Adobe Certified Associate-Flash, and Autodesk Certification (3D Studio Max or Maya). They learn complex technology skills that can be transferred to other careers, such as database development and management for business systems.

=== Cyber Security System Essentials ===
The Cisco Networking Academy is a program that teaches students how to design, build, troubleshoot, and secure computers and computer networks for increased access to career and economic opportunities. The Networking Academy provides online courses, interactive tools, and hands-on learning activities to help prepare students for careers in virtually every type of industry.

Students begin the program by studying the hardware and software of personal computers in preparation for the nationally recognized A+ Certification Exam. Hands-on labs and virtual desktop learning tools help students develop critical thinking and complex problem-solving skills. The Cisco CCNA curriculum provides an integrated and comprehensive coverage of networking topics, from fundamentals to advanced applications and services, while also providing opportunities for hands-on practical experience and soft-skills development. Students will be prepared for the CCNA and CCENT exams. Upon completion of the Cisco Academy curriculum, the student moves into the Security+ and Cyber Security class to finish the program.

This program allows students to develop the skills necessary to enter all fields of computer programming and computer engineering at the post-secondary level.

2013/2014 SkillsUSA State champions. 2013/2014 Future Business Leaders of America State and National Champions are presently in this class.

=== Biomedical engineering ===
Biotechnology is a field of applied biology that involves the use of living organisms andbioprocesses in engineering, technology, medicine and other fields requiring bioproducts; work in biotechnology includes genetic engineering as well as cell culture and tissue culture technologies. Students in this magnet program take a total of eight courses, four courses in Biotechnology and four in the Biomedical Sciences PLTW Program. PTLW classes contain some science but the courses also involve marketing. In fact, science is emphasized only in a marketing perspective rather than a medical perspective.

== Extracurricular Activities ==
Mu Alpha Theta

Middleton's Mu Alpha Theta team was one of the highest-ranked in the nation. In 2007, their team placed ninth in the FAMAT state convention, and seventh in the Mu Alpha Theta National Convention.

FBLA (Future Business Leaders of America)

Having won over 400 awards in its 8-year life span, Middleton FBLA has quickly made it to the #1 chapter in all of Florida and one of the top chapters in the nation in regards to national winners. With more than 70 business based competitions, FBLA caters to all. In the 2017–2018 school year, 130 students won at the district level, 50 won at the state level and 15 at the national level.

HOSA (Future Health Professionals) Middleton HOSA is one of the top chapters in the state and district. Middleton HOSA has over 100 members and has won awards on the state, national, and district level.

Speech and Debate Middleton has an award-winning speech and debate club winning at local and national competitions.

National Honor Society Middleton National Honor Society is the largest honor society on campus.

ACE Mentors (Architecture, Construction, and Engineering)

This club meets once a week to teach students more about architecture and civil engineering. Students are put into groups at the beginning of the school year and given a project that their group will complete step by step throughout the school year. The project changes every year and is always based on a real life construction project. At the end of the year, groups present their projects in front of a panel of real civil engineers and architects and can win prizes including scholarships.

== Athletics ==
In 1957, Middleton won the Florida state championship in basketball in the FIAA, which was the athletic organization for schools with black students. In 1964, they won it again.

Sports available at Middleton include Baseball, Basketball, Cheer leading, Cross Country, Football, Flag Football, Golf, Soccer, Softball, Swimming, Tennis, Track, Volleyball, and Wrestling.

Rivalry

The school's rival high school is Howard W. Blake High School (Middleton and Blake were the two African-American high schools during segregation). The yearly football game, held at Tampa's Raymond James Stadium, is highly anticipated.

== Notable alumni ==
- Delores P. Aldridge, sociologist
- Jay Bowie, basketball player
- Walter Lee Gibbons, baseball player
- Josh Johnson (baseball coach), minor league baseball player and manager of the Down East Wood Ducks
- Gwen Miller, member of the Tampa City Council
- Les Miller, politician
- Lloyd Mumphord (1965), NFL defensive back and two-time Super Bowl champion with Dolphins
- Ted Washington Sr., football player
- Stoney Woodson, football player

== Demographic information ==
Total Enrollment	1,595 students
East Asian	11.07%
Black	48.0%
Hispanic	19.06%
South Asian	120%
Multi	N/A
White	16.07%

- 96% of students at Middleton are proficient in English.
- 73% of students come from low income households
- 56% of the students at Middleton are male, while 44% are female.
