= Everyone In =

British government initiative to help rough sleepers

Everyone in was a British government initiative designed to help rough sleepers during the COVID-19 pandemic. It was widely viewed as a success. It started in March 2020, with central government directing local authorities to provide space for all rough sleepers, regardless of their legal eligibility for aid. This resulted in a massive reduction in rough sleeping. Government figures estimated that 33,000 people had been helped by the initiative, although these figures have been disputed. The funding was withdrawn in June 2020.

In 2021, the Kerslake Commission recommended that the level of support provided by Everyone In should be maintained in order to combat the need for rough sleeping.
