= Corn Exchange and Fire Station, Oxford =

Commercial building in Oxford, Oxfordshire, England

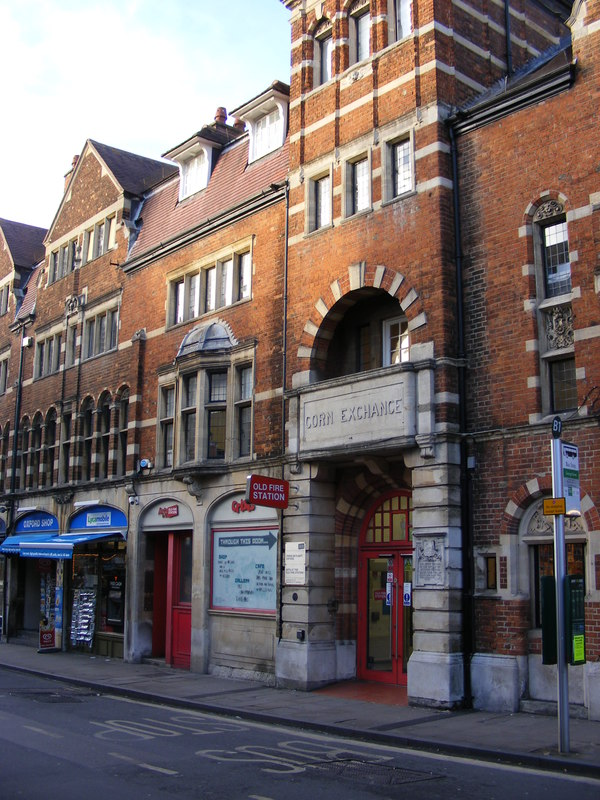
- Corn Exchange and Fire Station, Oxford

- Shown in Oxfordshire
- 51.7536°N 1.2624°W
- Location: George Street, Oxford

History
- Built: 1895

Site notes
- Architect: Harry Wilkinson Moore
- Architectural style: Italianate style

The Corn Exchange and Fire Station is a commercial complex in George Street in Oxford, Oxfordshire, England. The structure is now occupied by an arts charity, Arts at the Old Fire Station, and a homelessness charity, Crisis Skylight Oxford.

== History ==
=== St Aldate's Corn Exchange ===
For much of the 19th century, corn merchants in Oxford conducted their trade in the open air in Cornmarket Street. In the early 1860s, a group of local businessmen decided to form a private company, known as the "Oxford Corn Exchange Company", to finance and commission a purpose-built corn exchange for the city. The site they chose was on the east side of St Aldate's. The St Aldate's building was designed by the city surveyor, Samuel Lipscomb Seckham, in the Grecian and mixed style and was completed in April 1863.

The St Aldate's building was extensively used for public events: a banquet to celebrate the founding of the Oxford Union was presided over by the Lord Chancellor, Roundell Palmer, 1st Earl of Selborne, and attended by the former Prime Minister, Robert Gascoyne-Cecil, 3rd Marquess of Salisbury, in October 1873. The suffragist, Lilias Ashworth Hallett, talked about women's suffrage there in April 1878, Canon Basil Wilberforce addressed an audience of 1,000 undergraduates there to talk about evangelicalism in 1882, and the former President of the Board of Trade, Joseph Chamberlain, was also a speaker there in May 1890. The St Aldate's building was demolished to facilitate the construction of Oxford Town Hall in 1893.

=== George Street complex ===
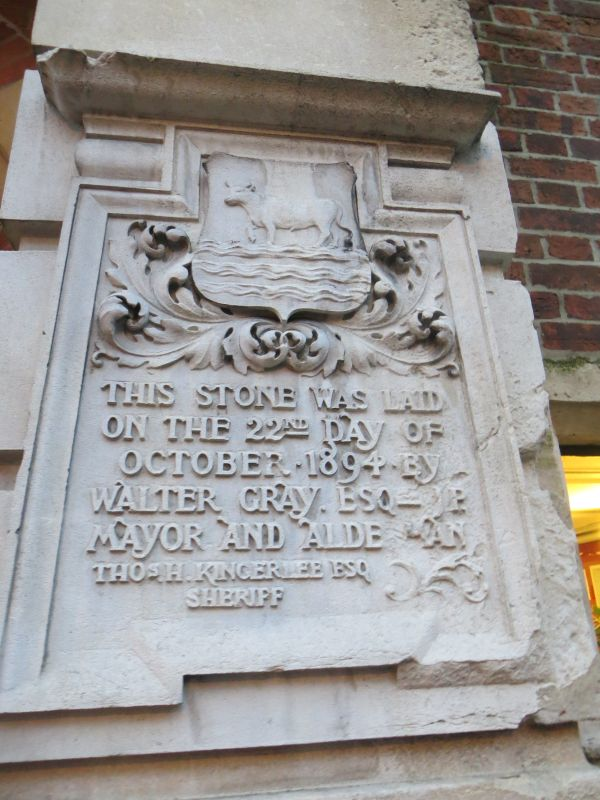
Foundation stone

Meanwhile, an early fire station had been established by the newly formed volunteer fire brigade in New Inn Hall Street in 1874. However, in late 1893, the corn traders began to agitate for a new corn exchange, and council leaders saw this as an opportunity to commission a combined corn exchange and fire station complex. The site chosen by council leaders, on the north side of George Street had been occupied by a row of 17th century houses.

The foundation stone for the new complex was laid by the mayor, Alderman Walter Gray, on 22 October 1894. It was designed by Harry Wilkinson Moore in the Italianate style, built by Thomas Axtell in red brick with stone dressings at a cost of £12,500 and was completed in September 1895. The design involved an asymmetrical main frontage facing onto George Street with the corn exchange on the left and the fire station on the right. On the ground floor, there were a series of segmentally headed openings which allowed access to the main corn trading hall and to the garaging area for the fire engines. The corn exchange, which occupied five bays, was fenestrated by oriel windows and by tri-partite round headed windows on the first floor, by mullioned windows on the second floor, and by mullioned windows surmounted by gables on the third floor. There was a four-stage tower in the right-hand bay of the corn exchange. The fire station, which occupied two bays, was fenestrated by a mullioned and transomed window and an oriel window on the first floor, and by a mullioned window and an oriel window, both surmounted by gables, on the second floor. Internally, the principal room was the main trading hall which was 71 feet (22 m) long and 53 feet (16 m) wide.

The use of the complex as a corn exchange declined significantly almost immediately in the wake of the Great Depression of British Agriculture in the late 19th century. Instead, the corn exchange became a venue for public events: speakers included the future Chancellor of the Exchequer, Sir John Simon who addressed a meeting demanding peace with Ireland in November 1920.

After corn trading moved to Oxpens Road in 1932, the corn exchange finally closed and the space was taken over by Pickfords who used it for storage. Meanwhile, the fire service relocated to Rewley Road in 1971, and the whole complex was leased by the Oxford Playhouse Company for storage purposes later that year.

The complex started operating as a theatre under the auspices of the Oxford Arts Council in 1973. Many theatrical performances took place in the venue which, for much of its early life, was known as the "Old Fire Station Theatre". The homelessness charity, Crisis Skylight Oxford, has shared the space, co-located with the charity, Arts at the Old Fire Station, which manages the theatre, since 2011.

== See also ==
- Corn exchanges in England
