= Mary Pattillo =

American sociologist

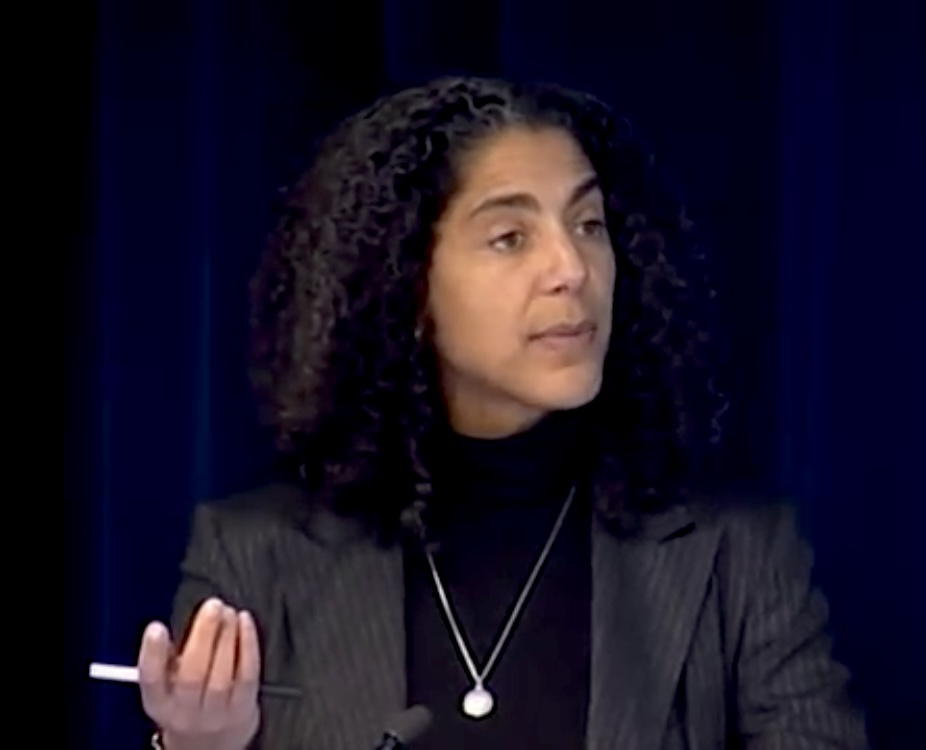
- Mary Pattillo speaks in 2008
- Born: Milwaukee, Wisconsin
- Citizenship: United States
- Education: Columbia University (BA); University of Chicago (PhD)
- Occupation: Sociologist
- Employer: Northwestern University
- Notable work: Black Picket Fences; Black on the Block
- Title: Harold Washington Professor of Sociology; Chair of the Department of Black Studies

Mary Pattillo is an American professor and ethnographer of African American studies at Northwestern University. She is the Harold Washington Professor of Sociology and chair of the Department of Black Studies. As of 2016, she has served as director of undergraduate studies in African American studies and has been a faculty associate in Northwestern's Institute for Policy Research since 2004. She has formerly served as chair of Northwestern University's department of sociology.

== Early life and education ==
Mary Pattillo was born in Milwaukee, Wisconsin, to parents originally from Louisiana. Pattillo attended Columbia University as an undergraduate, majoring in urban studies and sociology, earning a Bachelor of Arts in 1991. Pattillo then earned a Master of Arts in 1994 and Ph.D. from University of Chicago in sociology in 1997.

=== Influences ===
Pattillo's parents grew up in Louisiana during segregation. Louisiana State University paid for her father to attend medical school out of state rather than enroll a black student. By contrast, in high school, post-Civil Rights Movement, Pattillo was part of a busing program to desegregate Milwaukee-area schools, a sign of the movement's significant gains; yet Pattillo also noticed continuing housing discrimination and protests against police brutality that called into question the success of the movement, a topic that became central to her scholarship.

== Career ==
=== Research ===
Pattillo is an ethnographer whose research focuses on the Black middle class, the intersections of race and public policy, and urban communities, particularly in Chicago. Some of her other research interests include race and ethnicity in the United States and Latin America, class stratification, school choice, criminal justice, qualitative methodologies, and African American studies.

Pattillo's experiences growing up in a middle-class Black family were formative to her research and teaching. Living in a Black community in Milwaukee and moving from a segregated elementary school to being bused into a wealthy white suburban high school generated Pattillo's interest in sociology and provided her with some of the research questions she continues to answer in her studies. As Milwaukee and her current residence of Chicago are located in close proximity to each other in the Midwest, both have large, diverse, and vibrant African American communities, and both are hypersegregated, Pattillo often draws parallels between the two in writings and interviews.

=== Teaching ===
Pattillo's undergraduate and graduate African American Studies and Sociology courses include Introduction to Sociology, Cities in Society, Field Methods, Urban Ethnography, The Obama Effect, Social Meaning of Race, Housing, Community and Public Policy, Introduction to Black Social and Political Life, Researching Black Communities, Urban Poverty, and Race, Politics, Society, and Culture.

=== Civic engagement ===
Pattillo is a founding board member and current Board Vice-chair at Urban Prep Academies, a charter high school network for boys in Chicago that educates a predominantly Black student body. She also serves as a board member of The Chicago Community Trust's African American Legacy Initiative and is on the Advisory Committee of the National Public Housing Museum.

== Publications ==
- "Church Culture as a Strategy of Action in the Black Community" (Mary Pattillo-McCoy) American Sociological Review 63(6) (Dec., 1998), 767-784.
- Black Picket Fences (University of Chicago Press, 1999)
- Black on the Block (University of Chicago Press, 2007)

== Honors ==
- Fellow, Straus Institute for the Advanced Study of Law and Justice, New York University School of Law
- Faculty Appreciation Award, from For Members Only: Northwestern University's Black Student Alliance, 2009
- Northwestern Associated Student Government Faculty Honor Roll, 2008
- Visiting professor, Observatoire sociologique du changement (OSC), Sciences Po, Paris, France, 2008
- Winner of the Robert Park Best Book Award, Community and Urban Sociology Section of the American Sociological Association for Black on the Block, 2007
- Honorable Mention, Distinguished Contribution to Scholarship Book Award, Race, Class, Gender Section of the American Sociological Association for Black on the Block, 2007
- "Favorite Books of 2007," Chicago Tribune for Black on the Block Received City of Chicago Resolution in honor of Black on the Block, 2007
- Received Columbia College Alumna Achievement Award, 2004
- Named Northwestern University Arthur Andersen Research and Teaching Professor in 2004
- Fulbright-Hays Seminars Abroad Program, Brazil, 2003
- Visiting scholar, Center for the Study of Race, Politics, and Culture, University of Chicago, 2002-2003
- Faculty affiliate, Alice Berline Kaplan Center for the Humanities, Northwestern University, 2000-2001
- Outstanding Academic Book Award, Choice: Current Reviews for Academic Libraries, 2000
- Winner of the Oliver Cromwell Cox Best Book Award, Racial and Ethnic Minorities Section, American Sociological Association for Black Picket Fences, 2000
- Honorable Mention, Robert Park Award for Distinguished Book Publication, Community and Urban Sociology Section, American Sociological Association, for Black Picket Fences, 2000
- Visiting Minority Fellow, Institute for Research on Poverty, University of Wisconsin, 2000
- Distinguished Article Award, Society for the Scientific Study of Religion, 1999
- Ford Foundation Postdoctoral Fellowship in Poverty, the Underclass, and Public Policy, University of Michigan, 1997-1998
