= Association of Black Sociologists =

American learned society

- Formation: 1970
- Founded at: Washington, D. C.
- Type: Learned society
- Purpose: Scholarship, advocacy
- Headquarters: Chicago, Illinois
- Executive Officer: Loren Henderson
- President: Derrick R. Brooms
- Vice President: Nishaun Battle
- Immediate Past President: Andrea S. Boyles
- Key people: James E. Blackwell (first president)
- Parent organization: American Sociological Association
- Website: associationofblacksociologists.org
- Formerly called: Caucus of Black Sociologists

The Association of Black Sociologists (ABS) is an American learned society dedicated to the advancement of scholarship by African American sociologists. It is based in Chicago, Illinois. Its official journal is Issues in Race & Society, which it publishes in a partnership with Vanderbilt University's Peabody College. The association was founded in 1970. Today, it is led by an Executive Committee with multiple roles that meets once a year. These positions are decided through elections.

== History ==
The history of the Association of Black Sociologists began in 1968, when a group of American sociologists met to encourage the American Sociological Association (ASA) to increase the participation of black Americans in their ranks. It was officially established in 1970 as the Caucus of Black Sociologists (CBS) at that year's ASA meeting in Washington, D.C. The CBS was influenced by both the women's liberation movement and opposition to the Vietnam War. In 1976, the CBS was incorporated as an independent organization, the Association of Black Sociologists. As a result, it ceased to be a caucus of the ASA.

At the time of its founding, James E. Blackwell of the University of Massachusetts stood as the first president. He organized the group along with Jacquelyne J. Jackson of Duke University, James E. Conyers of Indiana State University, and Joseph W. Scott of the University of Notre Dame.

== Membership ==
When it was founded in 1970, the ABS (then known as the CBS) had 76 members, a number which had grown to 88 by 1979.

Members are led by an Executive Committee of 10 people. This committee includes an Association President, the Association President-Elect, a Treasurer, The Immediate Past President, and an Executive Officer. Besides these roles, the committee is also composed of a Membership Chair, a Communications Chair, three Elected-at-Large members, an Editor of the ABS official journal, a Secretary, and a Newsletter Editor. This committee serves to create policies and lead the association.

Currently, The Executive Committee includes Kiyona Brewster of Centre College, George L. Wimberly of the American Educational Research Association, Mary Pattillo of Northwestern University, Korey Tillman of the University of New Mexico, Quinesha Bentley of the University of Illinois, Regina Dixon-Reeves of the University of San Diego, and Michael Royster of Prairie View A&M University. Loren Henderson of the University of Maryland holds the Executive Officer, Derrick R. Brooms of Morehouse College holds the President position, and Nishaun Battle holds the Vise President position. Andrea S. Boyles of Tulane University is the Immediate Past President.

== Elections ==
When it comes to selecting leaders, the association also has elections. These elections are open for at least 30 days, and people vote on who they want to be leader(s). To keep things running smoothly, some leadership positions start with different lengths of time, but usually, terms are two years. Members can suggest who should run by May 1 before the election, and the group makes sure those people are eligible. At least two people are put on the ballot for each role, and after voting, the results are shared, and the ballots are saved for a year.

The President is elected by all active members and must have been part of the group for at least three years. They serve one year as President-Elect, then one year as President. The Secretary is also elected for two years.

Some other roles like the Treasurer, Executive Officer, Membership Chair, Communications Chair, Journal Editor, and Newsletter Editor are chosen by the President and must be approved by the leadership team. These roles last from three to four years and can be renewed. If someone can’t do their job well, the leadership team can step in to make sure everything keeps running smoothly

== Mission Statement ==
The Association of Black Sociologists (ABS) states that it is "committed to maintaining and cultivating a prophetic tradition of scholarship, mentoring, service, and social justice."

=== Objectives ===
The Association of Black Sociologists originated as a section within the American Sociological Association before becoming an independent organization. It aims to advance the discipline of sociology with a particular emphasis on Black sociological thought and scholarship. The organization outlines eight guiding principles, which emphasize the promotion of sociological research, the recognition and inclusion of Black sociologists' contributions—both historical and contemporary—and the cultivation of an intellectual network of scholars in the field. In addition to academic goals, the ABS advocates for addressing social issues such as racism, discrimination, marginalization, and unequal access to resources. The organization engages in public discourse to raise awareness about these issues and supports the dissemination of information to affected communities, with the intention of fostering empowerment and social change. The ABS also provides a platform for emerging sociologists, encouraging the integration of new perspectives into its collective knowledge base. It seeks to create a supportive environment for scholars, particularly those who may face challenges related to academic freedom or censorship.

== Group Meetings ==
The Association of Black Sociologists holds a national convention every year.

The Executive Committee decides the time, place, and how the convention is run. At least one official meeting is held during the convention, where the National President and the Treasurer give reports. The Executive Committee also meets at least once a year. Members can send resolutions by email at least 30 days before the convention. All meetings follow Robert's Rules of Order. If 10% or more of Regular and Life Members support a proposal, it can become a referendum. The Executive Committee will then send it to all members for a vote, following the rules for changing the bylaws.

The Location and Schedule of the Meeting

55th/ Memphis, Tennessee/ October 9 to 11, 2025

54th/ Montreal, Quebec/ August 8 to 10, 2024

53th/ Philadelphia, Pennsylvania/ August 17 to 19, 2023

== Publication ==
- Issues in Race and Society: An Interdisciplinary Global Journal: Complete 2019, Association of Black Sociologists, edited by Hayward Derrick Horton, Melvin E. Thomas, John Sibley Butler, published by University of Cincinnati Press in 2019.
- Issues in Race and Society: An Interdisciplinary Global Journal: Spring 2020, Special Issue on the Global Black Middle Class, Association of Black Sociologists, edited by Hayward Derrick Horton, Melvin E. Thomas, John Sibley Butler, published by University of Cincinnati Press in 2020.
- Issues in Race and Society: An Interdisciplinary Global Journal: Spring 2021, Association of Black Sociologists, edited by Hayward Derrick Horton, Melvin E. Thomas, John Sibley Butler, published by University of Cincinnati Press in 2021.
