= Chelsea Fringe =

Garden festival in London, England

Jonathan Trustram leading the Self Seeders Walk, showing the use of self-seeding plants by the Putting Down Roots project of St Mungo's.

Chelsea Fringe was a garden festival in London which ran concurrently with the Chelsea Flower Show. It consisted of a variety of events and displays across multiple locations in London. It was started in 2012 by Tim Richardson and is run by volunteers. In 2012, events included guerrilla gardening, a bicycle beer garden and oranges and lemons at Shoreditch.

In 2013, the fringe expanded to approximately 200 separate events, with the core site being a pop-up park at Battersea Power Station. Ben Dark, reviewing for The Daily Telegraph, described the fringe as a "sprawling mess" but praised most of the exhibits which he visited, including the Gnome Invasion of Ockendon Road, the Dalston Eastern Curve Garden, and the Office Garden in Buckingham Palace Road.

The festival was suspended in 2024 when Tim Richardson stepped down as the main organiser. It featured more than 2,220 events in its run of 12 years.
