= Lloyd Mumphord =

American football player (born 1946)

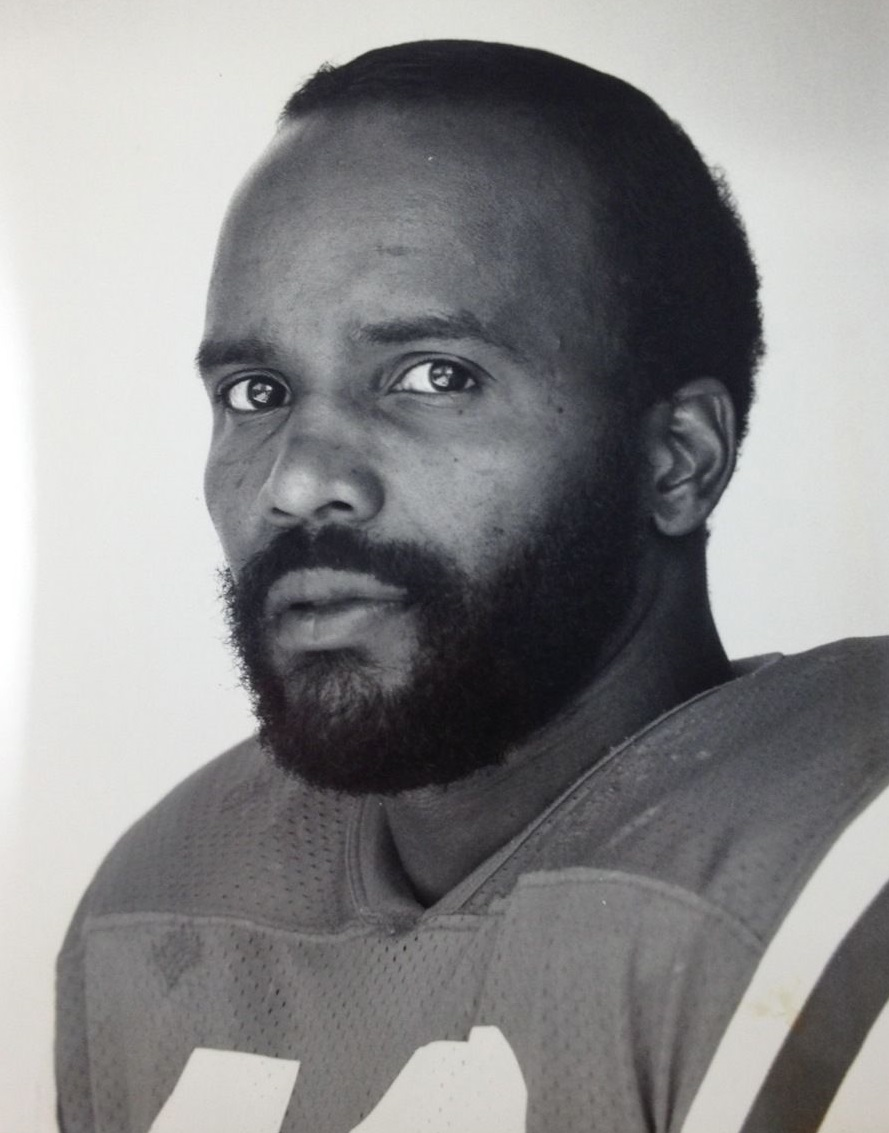
- Mumphord in 1978

No. 26, 42
- Position: Defensive back

Personal information
- Born: December 20, 1946 (age 79); Los Angeles, California, U.S.
- Listed height: 5 ft 10 in (1.78 m)
- Listed weight: 176 lb (80 kg)

Career information
- High school: George S. Middleton (Tampa, Florida)
- College: Texas Southern (1968)
- NFL draft: 1969: 16th round, 401st overall pick

Career history
- Miami Dolphins (1969-1974); Baltimore Colts (1975–1978)

Awards and highlights
- 2× Super Bowl champion (VII, VIII)

Career NFL/AFL statistics
- Interceptions: 21
- Fumble recoveries: 7
- Touchdowns: 3
- Sacks: 2
- Stats at Pro Football Reference

Lloyd N. Mumphord (born December 20, 1946) is a former defensive back who played collegiately for Texas Southern University and ten seasons in American professional football. He played professionally for the Miami Dolphins of the American Football League (AFL) and the Dolphins and Baltimore Colts of the National Football League (NFL).

He played in three Super Bowls for the Dolphins, and served as their captain of the Special Teams. He currently holds NFL records for punt and kick blocks in a season and a career.

Mumphord graduated from Middleton High School in Tampa, Florida in 1965.

== See also ==
- Other American Football League Players
