= Lippiatt v Electoral Registration Officer, Penwith District Council =

1996 English court case

Lippiatt v Electoral Registration Officer, Penwith District Council was a 1996 County Court case about electoral registration and the right to vote for homeless people in the United Kingdom. Kevin Lippiatt, a homeless person, sued Penwith District Council to be allowed onto the electoral register despite not having a permanent residence. Lippiatt won the case, generating significant coverage, but failed to set a precedent due it not being decided in the High Court. The law was later amended by the Representation of the People Act 2000 to allow homeless people to more easily register to vote.

== Background ==
Kevin Lippiatt (born c. 1962/1963) was a builder and former environmental activist in Penzance, Cornwall with no fixed address. According to Lippiatt, he "usually stay[ed] within 20 miles" of his place of work and "[tried] not to be on benefit. [sic]" In 1996, he attempted to be added to the electoral register but was refused after Penwith District Council's electoral registration officer decided Lippiatt could not be added because he had no permanent accommodation.

Lippiatt had provided the Penzance Breadline Centre, a day centre he regularly visited, as his address, but this had been rejected by the registration officer. Lippiatt used the day centre as his mail address and was registered there with various government agencies as well as Inland Revenue.

A public letter from Liberty to the Lancaster Guardian in March 1996 said that Lippiatt had "appealed to respective political groups" in the area to help him but was ignored. He was then supported by Liberty and CHAR, a housing charity, "who solicited the sympathetic ear of Tony Blair" and took the case to court.

== Court case ==
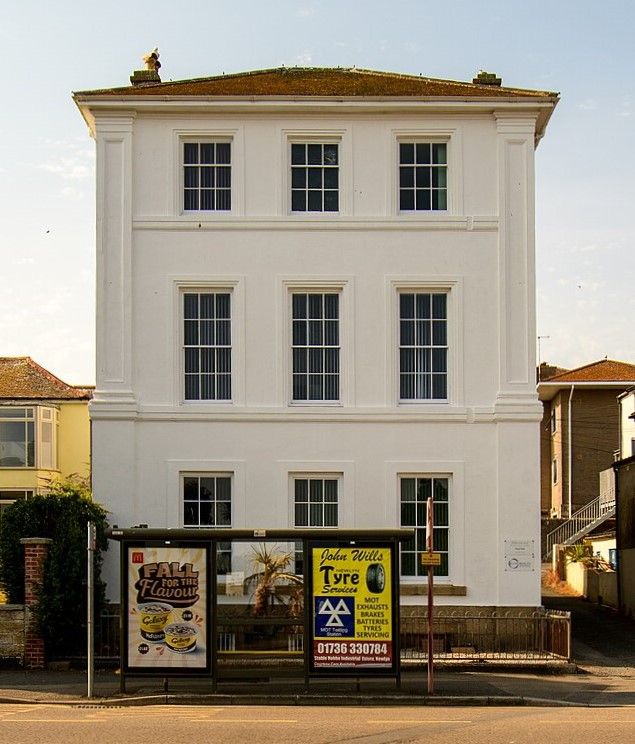
Trevear House, the former location of Penzance County Court, in July 2022

In the appeal to Penzance County Court, the council argued that a person cannot be resident at a place where they do not sleep, citing a number of historic legal authorities and Halsbury's Laws of England; Lippiatt (with the support of Liberty) argued that it was a fundamental right to be able to vote and that electoral law did not specify that a person had to sleep at the address they registered with.

Judge Anthony Thompson agreed with Lippiatt, noting that the European Convention of Human Rights protected the right to vote regardless of social origin or property ownership. Thompson wrote: "It cannot be right that simply because a person is homeless therefore he is deprived of the right to vote."

== Response and aftermath ==
The case was described as a historic and landmark decision in some newspapers. The West Briton commented that the ruling meant "day centres across the country will now be able to register homeless people as voters." The Sunderland Daily Echo reported that "[h]omeless people have won the right to vote".

Despite this, the case did not set a precedent due to it being decided in the County Court rather than the High Court. In response to a written question from Diana Maddock, Home Office minister Tom Sackville said that the government's guidance to electoral registration officers would "take the judgement fully into consideration". The guidance, released in July 1996, said that the case should not be used to decide on similar applications. This meant that despite Lippiatt's victory, homeless people were generally only added to the electoral register when they could prove some sort of residence, such as at hostels or shelters.

In August 1996, Lippiatt announced his decision to stand to be an MP at the 1997 general election in St Ives. He said that being an MP would give him "a bit more chance to change things"; according to Lippiatt, many people had said they would vote for him if he stood. He had no money to campaign with, no detailed manifesto and no campaign office. George O'Neill, a leader of the homeless charity CHAR which had supported Lippiatt's court case, said that his candidacy "shows that homeless people are normal human beings", deserving of "the same respect and dignity as anyone else." Standing as an independent, Lippiatt won 178 votes (0.3% of the vote) and came seventh out of eight candidates at the election; Liberal Democrat Andrew George won the seat.

The Representation of the People Act 2000 amended the previous legislation to allow "declarations of local connection" to be made for those who do not have a permanent residence. In such cases, a person can give a location where they "commonly spend a substantial part of [their] time". According to the Electoral Commission, this could be places such as "a bus shelter, a park bench or the doorway to a high street store."

== See also ==
- Homelessness in the United Kingdom
