= La Francis Rodgers-Rose =

Dr. La Francis Rodgers-Rose
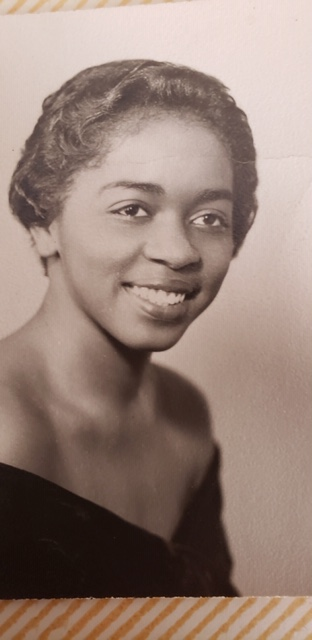
- Born: Norfolk, Virginia

Academic background
- Education: Morgan State University, Fisk University, and University of Iowa

Academic work
- Discipline: Sociologist
- Sub-discipline: African American studies

La Francis Rodgers-Rose was an American sociologist and Founder/CEO of the International Black Women’s Congress.

== Early life and education ==
La Francis Rodgers-Rose was born in Norfolk, Virginia, and grew up in segregated Portsmouth, Virginia with her mother, two older brothers and younger sister.

She graduated from Morgan State University with honours in sociology and anthropology in 1958, where her commencement speaker was the Rev. Dr. Martin Luther King Jr. She later also graduated from Fisk University. She also attended the University of Iowa for her PhD, studying social psychology.

== Career ==
Dr. La Francis Rodgers-Rose took up her first full-time teaching post in 1964 and held many teaching positions until 1972 when she left to take up a position at Educational Testing Services in Princeton, New Jersey. She returned to teaching a year later, after differences in direction between herself and the organization. She has over 30 years of teaching experience; she taught African American Studies at Princeton University for 16 years, and has taught at Case Western Reserve University, Rutgers University, the University of Pennsylvania, and Drew University.

Rodgers-Rose is the author of The Black Woman, published in 1980 by Sage Publications, the first textbook in the social sciences about Black women from their own perspectives. In this book, she highlights that although Black women participate in the labour market at higher rates, the jobs they occupy are more likely to be less secure, have fewer benefits, and pay less than those held by white women.

She is the Founder/CEO of the International Black Women’s Congress, a nonprofit organisation for women of African ancestry, which she founded in 1983 in Newark, New Jersey. It aims to surface social, political and economic empowerment in a global community of Black women.

In 2017 she was the recipient of a Malcolm X Black Unity Awards from the Organisation of Black Unity in the UK.

She is described by American sociologist Dolores P. Aldridge as one of the pioneering black woman sociologists.

== Personal life ==
After suffering from congestive heart failure, Rodgers-Rose had a heart transplant aged 65. She is an advocate for health and organ donation in the African-American community.
