= Alabaré =

English charity

ALABARÉ
- Pronunciation: Uh-LAB-uh-RAY, rhymes with cabaret
- Founded: 1991
- Founders: Revd John Proctor OBE, Alicia Proctor
- Type: Registered Charity
- Headquarters: Riverside House, 2 Watt Road, Salisbury, England
- Region served: South West England and Wales
- Key people: Andrew Lord MBE, Lieutenant General Sir Andrew Gregory
- Website: alabare.co.uk

ALABARÉ is a registered charity based in Salisbury, England. Founded in 1991 by Revd John Proctor OBE and his wife Alicia, the organisation provides accommodation and support for individuals experiencing homelessness, armed forces veterans, young people, young parents, adults with learning disabilities, and those facing mental health challenges.

== History ==
ALABARÉ was established in 1991 by John and Alicia Proctor and the Alabaré Christian Community in Salisbury. The charity's first project, Barnabas House, opened in 1992 as accommodation for vulnerable women. In 1995, Damascus House was opened to support homeless men, followed by Emmaus Christian Community in 1996, a registered care home for people with learning disabilities.

By the early 2000s, ALABARÉ had expanded into regional services. The Barford Development Centre for people with learning disabilities opened in 2003, the same year the charity became a South West regional organisation and introduced the Foyer Scheme for young people in Test Valley. A parent and baby home in Wiltshire was established in 2007.

In 2009, ALABARÉ expanded into Plymouth, opening its first home in the city. In 2011, Damascus House was replaced by Alabaré Place, a supported living facility funded by a £1.2 million grant. The charity expanded its veterans' services into Wales in 2014 and took over the Old Sarum Development Centre, continuing its work with people with learning disabilities.

In 2017, the organisation consolidated its Wiltshire services for young people and individuals experiencing homelessness. The Alabaré Academy launched in 2019 to offer training and support for young people. In 2020, the Riverside Sanctuary began providing in-person and telephone services for people in mental health crisis, and the Boots on the Ground programme was introduced to support veterans and young people through outdoor activities.

In 2023, ALABARÉ became a delivery partner in Op Fortitude, a government initiative providing comprehensive support for homeless veterans. In 2025, the charity launched the Mental Health and Wellbeing Partnership, delivering community mental health services across Bath and North East Somerset, Swindon, and Wiltshire.

== Services ==
ALABARÉ provides housing and support services for people facing homelessness, veterans, young people often leaving care, parents with young children, adults with learning disabilities, and individuals experiencing mental health issues.

Its homelessness services focus on accommodation and structured support to help adults move toward independent living. Veterans' programmes include housing, wellbeing activities, training opportunities, and the Veterans' Self Build Scheme in Plymouth and Ludgershall, Wiltshire, where ex-service personnel build affordable homes while gaining construction skills.

Support for young people includes housing, education, and employment guidance, while parent and baby homes provide accommodation and life skills training for parents aged 16 to 25. Services for adults with learning disabilities include supported living and activity-based programmes promoting independence. Mental health services include crisis support, counselling, drop-in centres, and wellbeing initiatives such as the Riverside Sanctuary.

== Projects and initiatives ==
ALABARÉ operates several projects and community-based initiatives.

- The BIG Sleep: A fundraising event held in locations including Salisbury Cathedral, the Tower of London, St Paul's Cathedral, and Stonehenge, where participants sleep outdoors to raise awareness of homelessness.
- Veterans' Self Build Scheme: A collaboration with LiveWest, Clarion Housing and Plymouth City Council enabling veterans to construct affordable housing while learning trade skills. A second scheme operates in Ludgershall, Wiltshire in collaboration with Stonewater and Lovell Homes.
- Training and community programmes: Including Boots on the Ground, the Prison Art Project, heritage work in the community and overseas, and various development centres offering life skills and community engagement opportunities.
- Mental Health Partnership: Established in 2025 to provide community-based mental health services in Bath and North East Somerset, Swindon, and Wiltshire.

== Awards and recognition ==
ALABARÉ has been rated good by the Care Quality Commission and has received recognition in national award programmes, including a nomination for the LGC Housing Awards. In 2024, the charity received the Employer of the Year award at the Welsh Veterans Awards, with a repeat win in 2025.

In 2025, ALABARÉ won Veterans Group of the Year at the English Veterans Awards, for the Self-Build project, as well as the IAE Global Health Award for Best Community Mental Health Care Provider for the UK. The charity was also named Charity/Non-Profit of the Year for the South West at The Business Exchange Awards.

== See also ==
- Homelessness in England
