= Walter Lee Gibbons =

American baseball player

- Pitcher
- Born: October 13, 1928; Tampa, Florida
- Died: July 24, 2015 (aged 86); Tampa, Florida
- Batted: Left Threw: Right
- Stats at Baseball Reference

Teams
- Philadelphia Stars (1941); New York Black Yankees (1941); Newark Eagles (1948); Indianapolis Clowns (1948–1949); Brandon Greys (1949–1950; 1954); Winnipeg Royals (1953); Minot Mallards (1955–1957)

Career highlights and awards
- Manitoba Baseball Hall of Fame induction (2006)

Walter Lee Gibbons (October 13, 1928 – July 24, 2015) was an American pitcher who played in Negro league baseball and the Minor Leagues. Listed at 5' 7" ft (1.70 m), 185 lb (84 kg), Gibbons batted left handed and threw right handed. He was born in Tampa, Florida.

== Biography ==
Gibbons, who earned the nicknames 'Dirk' and 'Bubblegum', was raised in the Historic Ybor City District, where he started playing baseball at age eight while pitching for the Pepsi Cola Juniors team. From there, he played with the Pepsi-Cola Giants and the Tampa Rockets of the Florida State Negro League during his teenage years.

Upon graduation from George S. Middleton High School in Tampa, Gibbons had the opportunity to play briefly in the Negro National League in 1941, as he compiled just one inning and lost his only decision while splitting the season between the Philadelphia Stars and the New York Black Yankees.

Afterwards, Gibbons pitched for the Indianapolis Clowns from 1948 to 1949. Nevertheless, he had his greatest successes neither in Florida nor the Negro leagues. It came when the Clowns sold him to the Brandon Greys of the Mandak League.

Gibbons then went to Canada and joined the Brandon club from 1949 to 1950. In his first season, he was the most dominant hurler in a league that also boasted Leon Day and Satchel Paige, as he went 19-5 and fanned 229 in 198 innings pitched, completing 20 of his 23 starts while leading the club in wins and the league in strikeouts. In addition, 12 of his 19 wins were consecutive and he tossed back-to-back one-hitters at one point. In 1950, he had a 8–4 in a short-season effort, completing 11 of his 12 starts, while finishing second in the league both in wins and complete games. After pitching in an exhibition game against the Jackie Robinson All-Stars late in the year, he was recruited for military service during the Korean War.

Following his discharge, Gibbons returned to the Mandak League to play five more years, including a new stop in Brandon (1954) and with the Winnipeg Royals (1953) and the Minot Mallards (1955–1957). Overall, he posted a 60–50 record during his seven years in the league.

After his baseball days, Gibbons went back to Florida and managed a night club for 20 years. He later worked for a long time at the training center of the University of Tampa as a supervisor for the Tampa Bay Buccaneers NFL franchise. In his spare time, he enjoyed the Tampa Bay Rays games at Tropicana Field, receiving a standing ovation when he threw out the first pitch in one of those home games.

Among his many honors and recognitions, Gibbons gained induction into the Manitoba Baseball Hall of Fame in 2006. Thereafter, he was selected by the Tampa Bay Rays during the 2008 Special Draft of the surviving Negro league players, which was held by Major League Baseball as a tribute for the surviving Negro leaguers who were kept out of the Big Leagues because of their race. During the ceremony, MLB clubs each selected a former NLB player. He then was honored in 2015 by the City of Tampa as part of its Annual Black History Month Celebration.

Gibbons died in 2015 in his homeland of Tampa Bay, Florida, at the age of 86.
