= Homelessness in England =

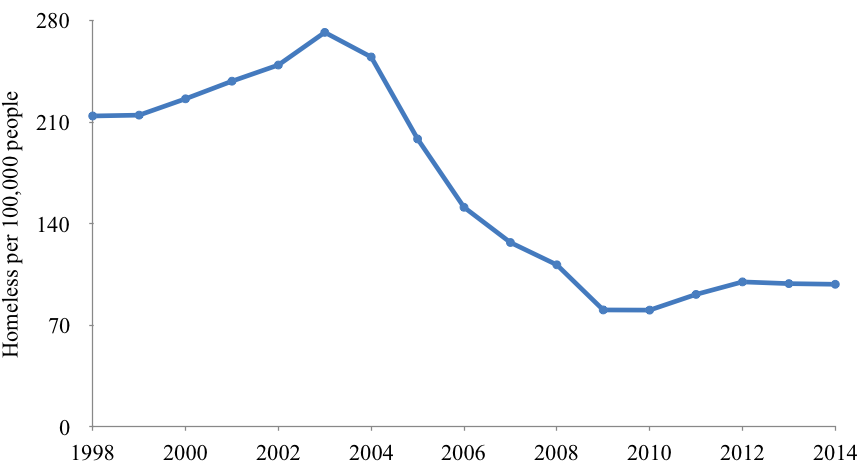
Number of homeless in England per 100,000 people 1998–2014

In England, local authorities have duties to homeless people under Part VII of the Housing Act 1996 as amended by the Homelessness Act 2002. There are five hurdles which a homeless person must overcome in order to qualify as statutory homeless. If an applicant only meets the first three of these tests councils still have a duty to provide interim accommodation. However an applicant must satisfy all five for a council to have to give an applicant "reasonable preference" on the social housing register. Even if a person passes these five tests councils have the ability to use the private rented sector to end their duty to a homeless person.

The five tests are:

- Is the applicant homeless or threatened with homelessness?
- Is the applicant eligible for assistance?
- Is the applicant priority need?
- Is the applicant intentionally homeless?
- Does the applicant have a local connection?

The yearly number of homeless households in England in 2003–04 was 135,420, before falling to a low of 40,020 in 2009–10. In 2014–15, there were 54,430 homeless households, which was 60 per cent below the number of people in 2003–04. However, in December 2016 the housing charity Shelter estimated homelessness in England to amount to more than 250,000 people; Shelter calculated the figure using four sets of official sources: statistics on rough sleepers (i.e. people sleeping on the streets), statistics on those in temporary accommodation, the number of people housed in hostels and the number of people waiting to be housed by council social services departments.

In England, it had been estimated in 2007 an average of 498 people slept rough each night, with 248 of those in London. But reportedly numbers sleeping rough have soared in recent years and doubled since 2010; figures reported for the 2015 count were 3,569 people rough sleeping in England on a single night, up 102% from 2010.

Given the costs of providing temporary accommodation and the limited amount of social housing in the United Kingdom some councils have been criticised for attempting to circumvent their duties under the law, a process which has been termed "gatekeeping". The term "Non-statutory homelessness" covers people who are considered by the local authority to be not eligible for assistance, not in priority need or "intentionally homeless".

Households in temporary accommodation rose from 35,850 in 2011 to 54,280 in early 2017. Part of the cause is people losing private tenancies, which Shelter maintains increased drastically since 2011 when housing benefit cuts began. Almost three quarters of homeless people are single parent families. Just under 30,000 single parent families became homeless in 2017, this rose 8% from five years previously. Their limited income makes it hard for them to deal with rising living costs, high rents and benefit cuts. The number of households in temporary accommodation has risen by almost two thirds since 2010 and reached 78,930. Mothers of single parent families are particularly at risk of homelessness. According to Shelter one in 55 single parent families became homeless in 2017 to 2018 and 92% of the 26,610 cases were headed by a mother. In 2023, the number of homeless people in England hit record levels, with 104,510 people in England in temporary accommodation. An estimated 3,898 people slept rough in England in 2023, over double the estimated figure from 2010.

In November 2025, the charity Crisis said that "around 189,000 families and individuals who faced the worst forms of homelessness such as rough sleeping, sofa surfing and living in tents were not included in official statistics", regarding homeless people in England. It also said that "the number of people facing the worst forms of homelessness has grown by a fifth since 2022 and now stands at around 300,000".

== Reasons for homelessness ==
In 2007/2008, the Office of the Deputy for Homelessness Statistics produced a table which showed some of the more immediate reasons for homelessness in England. These were not underlying reasons but before the onset of homelessness. These reasons were given by the minister's report for 2007/2008 as:

- 37% – Parents, family, or friends no longer willing or able to accommodate
- 20% – Loss of private dwelling, including tied accommodation
- 19% – Breakdown of relationship with partner
- 4% – Mortgage arrears
- 2% – Rent arrears
- 18% – other

The longer term causes of homelessness in England have been examined by a number of research studies. These suggest that both personal factors (e.g. addictions) and structural factors (e.g. poverty) are responsible for homelessness. A number of different pathways into homelessness have been identified. There are additional factors that appear to be causes of homelessness among young people, most notably needing to face the responsibilities of independent living before they are ready for them

The 2016 Homelessness Monitor report for England stated the bulk of the increase in statutory homelessness over the previous five years was attributable to sharply rising numbers of people made homeless from the private rented sector; as a proportion of all statutory homelessness acceptances loss of a private tenancy increased from 11 per cent in 2009-10 to 29 per cent in 2014-15 (from 4,600 to 16,000). This report concludes that 'homelessness worsened considerably' during the five years of the Coalition Government (2010–15) and adds 'services have been overwhelmed by the knock-on consequences of wider ministerial decisions, especially on welfare reform' (see Executive Summary).

== Government treatment of the homeless ==
=== Statutory Homelessness Tests ===
All local authorities in England have a legal duty to provide 24-hour advice to homeless people, or those who are at risk of becoming homeless within 28 days.

A local authority must accept an application for assistance from a person seeking homelessness assistance if they have reason to believe that the person may be homeless or threatened with homelessness. They are then duty bound to make inquiries into that person's circumstances in order to decide whether a legal duty to provide accommodation and assistance is owed. "Interim accommodation" must be provided to those that may be eligible for permanent assistance pending a final decision. If the local authority decides that a person is homeless but does not fall into a priority need category, then a lesser duty shall be owed which does not extend to the provision of temporary accommodation. If the authority decides that a person is homeless and priority need but became homeless intentionally then the authority must secure that accommodation is available for such a period as will give the person reasonable time to find long term accommodation, which can extend to provision of temporary accommodation. The local authority shall in all the above cases be lawfully obliged to offer advice and assistance.

If the applicant qualifies under the five criteria (that they are not ineligible for housing, such as a person subject to immigration control; that the applicant is statutorily homeless or threatened with homelessness; that they are of 'priority need'; that the applicant is not intentionally homeless; and that the applicant has a local connection) then the local authority has a legal duty to provide accommodation for the applicant, those living with them, and any other person who it is reasonable to reside with them. However, if the applicant does not have a local connection with the district of the authority then they may be referred to another local authority with which they have a local connection (unless it is likely that the applicant would suffer violence or threats of violence in that other area).

==== Homelessness ====
A person does not have to be roofless to qualify legally as being homeless. They may be in possession of accommodation which is not reasonably tenable for a person to occupy by virtue of its affordability, condition, location, if it is not available to all members of the household, or because an occupant is at risk of violence or threats of violence which are likely to be carried out.

==== Eligibility ====
Certain categories of persons from abroad (including British citizens who have lived abroad for some time) may be ineligible for assistance under the legislation.

==== Priority need ====
People have a priority need for being provided with temporary housing (and a given a 'reasonable preference' for permanent accommodation on the council's Housing Register) if any of the following apply:

- they are pregnant
- they have dependent children
- they are homeless because of an emergency such as a flood or a fire
- they are aged 16 or 17 (except certain care leavers [orphans, etc.] who remain the responsibility of social services)
- they are care leavers aged 18–20 (if looked after, accommodated or fostered while aged 16–17)
- they are vulnerable due to:
  - old age
  - a physical or mental illness
  - a handicap or physical disability
  - other special reason (such as a person at risk of exploitation)
- they are vulnerable as a result of
  - having been in care (regardless of age)
  - fleeing violence or threats of violence
  - service in one of the armed forces
  - having served a custodial sentence or having been remanded in custody.

==== Intentional homelessness ====
Under 191(1) and 196(1) of the Housing Act 1996, "a person becomes homeless intentionally or threatened with homelessness intentionally, if:

(1) A person becomes homeless intentionally if he deliberately does or fails to do anything in consequence of which he ceases to occupy accommodation which is available for his occupation and which it would have been reasonable for him to continue to occupy.
(2) For the purposes of subsection (1) an act or omission in good faith on the part of a person who was unaware of any relevant fact shall not be treated as deliberate.
(3) A person shall be treated as becoming homeless intentionally if—
(a) he enters into an arrangement under which he is required to cease to occupy accommodation which it would have been reasonable for him to continue to occupy, and
(b) the purpose of the arrangement is to enable him to become entitled to assistance under this Part, and there is no other good reason why he is homeless.
(4) A person who is given advice or assistance under section 197 (duty where other suitable alternative accommodation available), but fails to secure suitable accommodation in circumstances in which it was reasonably to be expected that he would do so, shall, if he makes a further application under this Part, be treated as having become homeless intentionally.

An act or omission made in good faith by someone who was unaware of any relevant fact must not be treated as deliberate.

==== Local connection ====
Someone may have a local connection with a local council area if they fulfil any of the following:

(1) they live in the area now or have done in the recent past,
(2) they work in the area, or
(3) they have close family in the area.

It is possible to have a local connection with more than one area.

== Rough sleeping ==
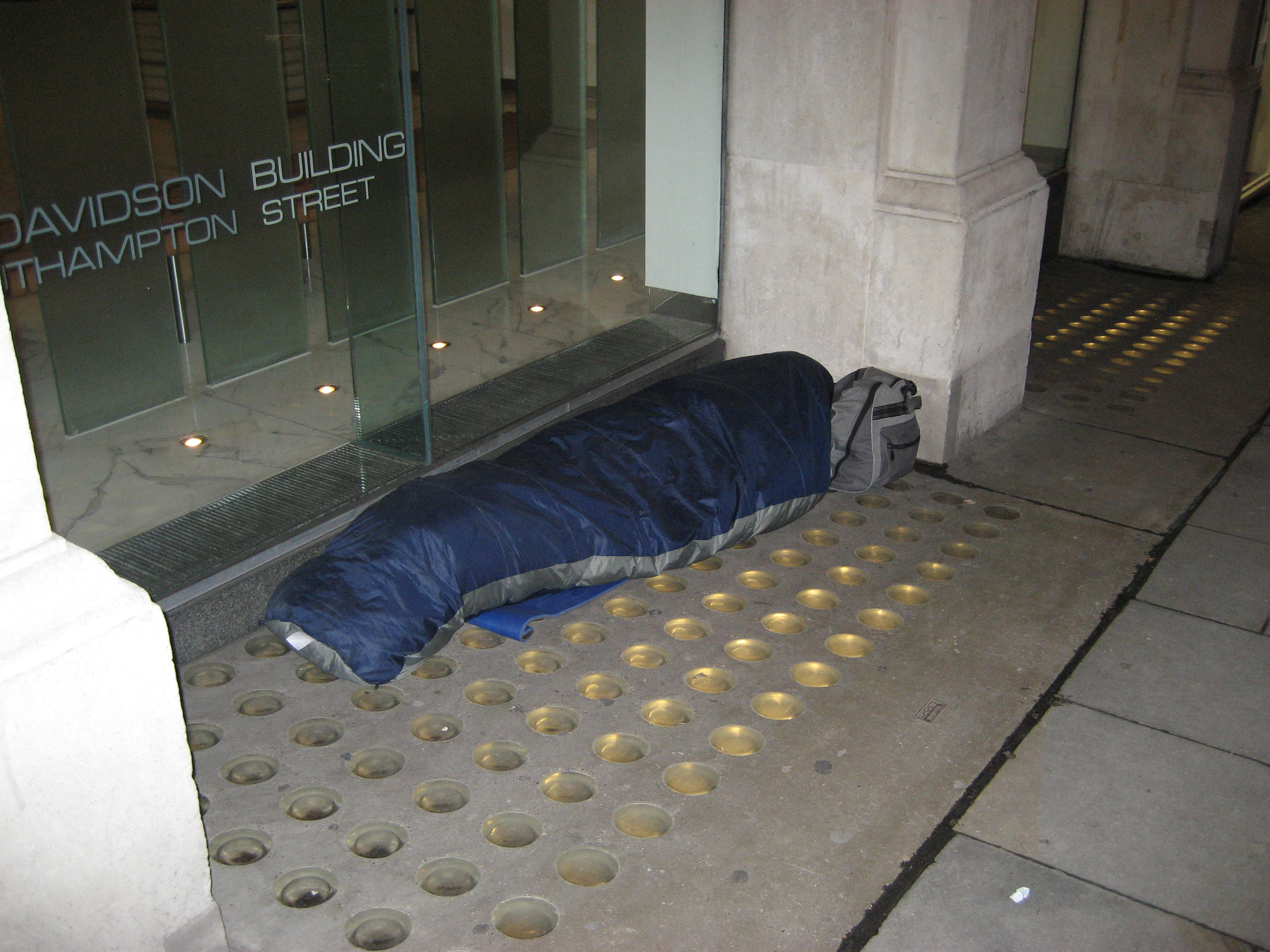
One of the rough sleepers of London. Southampton Street (a side street of the Strand, in the vicinity of Covent Garden).

Rough sleeping assessments do not count people sofa surfing or those who are in temporary shelters.

Despite considerable efforts, the official rough sleeper counts showed increases every year after new methodology was introduced in autumn 2010 up to the autumn 2017 count. The results of the 2017 count were published on 25 January 2018 – a 169% increase in the number of people sleeping rough in England since 2010 was recorded.

The recorded number of rough sleepers then fell by 2% in 2018 and 9% in 2019, although the 2019 count still represented a 141% increase on the 1,768 recorded in 2010. The 2020 count recorded a 37% drop in rough sleeping on 2019. This count coincided with a national lockdown and tier restrictions in response to Covid-19. The 2021 count recorded a further 9% fall on 2020 but was still up by 670 people (38%) on 2010.

The financial year report from the Combined Homelessness and Information Network (CHAIN) database, CHAIN Greater London Annual Report 2020–21 reported that a total of 11,018 rough sleepers were contacted by outreach workers or building-based teams in London during 2020/21. This represented a 3% increase on the previous year. 7,531 (68%) were seen rough sleeping for the first time.

Doug Saunders, a journalist for the Globe and Mail based in London, reports that starting in 1997, Britain’s Rough Sleepers Unit (RSU) successfully reduced the problem in the City of London, saying "for a decade, it worked: One of the world’s worst rough-sleeping crises was all but solved." The RSU effort was abandoned in 2010.

In February 2024, it was reported that an estimated 3,898 people slept rough in England in 2023, representing a 27% increase from the prior year and over double the number of people recorded in 2010.

=== Services for rough sleepers ===
A national service, called Streetlink, was established in 2012 to help members of the public obtain near-immediate assistance for specific rough sleepers, with the support of the Government (as housing is a devolved matter, the service currently only extends to England). Currently, the service does not operate on a statutory basis, and the involvement of local authorities is merely due to political pressure from the government and charities, with funding being provided by the government (and others) on an ad-hoc basis.

A member of the public who is concerned that someone is sleeping on the streets can report the individual's details via the Street Link website or by calling its referral line number. Someone who finds themselves sleeping on the streets can also report their situation using the same methods.

The service aims to respond within 24-hours, including an assessment of the individual circumstances and an offer of temporary accommodation for the following nights. The response typically includes a visit to the rough sleeper early in the morning that follows the day or night on which the report has been made. The service operates via a number of charities and with the assistance of local councils.

Where appropriate, rough sleepers will also be offered specialist support:

- if they have substance misuse issues, they will be referred for support from organisations such as St. Mungo's (despite the name, this is a non-religious charity)
- if they are foreign nationals with no right to access public funds in the UK, repatriation assistance will be offered, including finding accommodation in the home country, construction of support plans, and financial assistance.

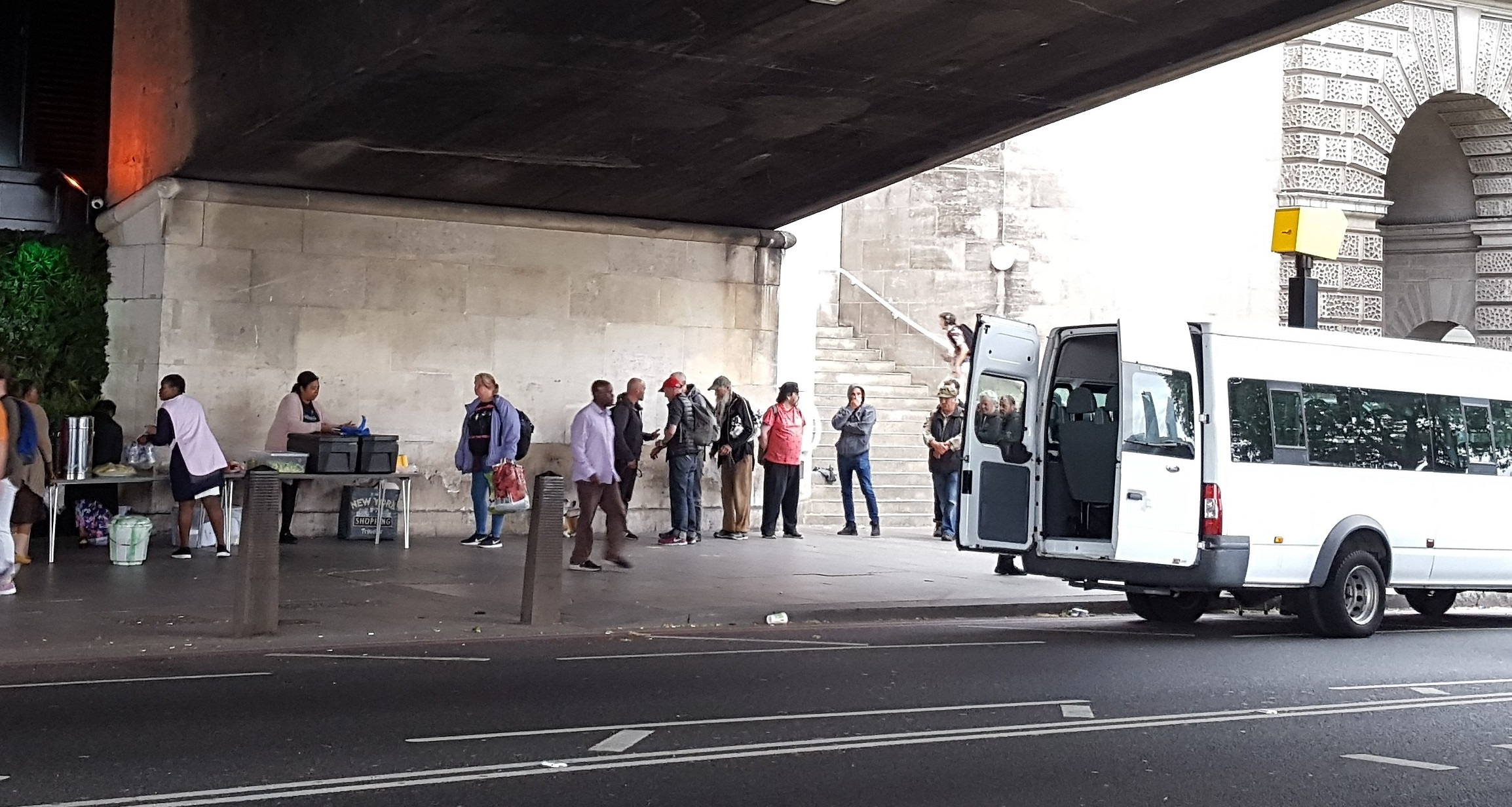
Soup Run provided by a charity

The service was piloted in London, in 2010, under the title No Second Night Out , which has been gone on to become the brand name used for the service in a number of other council areas, including Merseyside. Since the launch in 2010, a number of charities have provided the core functions of the service in London:

- Thames Reach runs the London Street Rescue Service which provides support to people sleeping on the streets of the capital,
- Broadway Outreach Teams provide services on the streets in the particular areas of Kensington and Chelsea, The City, and Heathrow Airport.

The Whitechapel Centre has provided similar services in Liverpool.

== Data ==
=== Localism Act ===
A provision of the Localism Act gave councils greater discretion to place those who are statutory homeless in private sector accommodation. Critics have argued that this masks the level of homelessness by deterring people from applying in the first place.

Critics have harshly critiqued the benefit cap and other welfare cuts, arguing that these policies lead to "social cleansing" and pointing to the displacement of families from inner London.

=== Homelessness Prevention Programme ===
Recognising that homelessness in England was a growing problem, the Government announced a £40m initiative in October 2016 to help prevent people becoming homeless. A network of Homelessness Prevention Trailblazer areas were funded to develop innovative approaches to prevent homelessness; early adopters included Greater Manchester, Newcastle and Southwark councils (HM Govt Homelessness Prevention Programme 17 October 2016). Prior to 2016, Newcastle upon Tyne had successfully applied a cooperative and preventative approach to homelessness by linking local government departments with other agencies and charities.

=== Homelessness Reduction Act 2017 ===
The Homelessness Reduction Act 2017 placed a new duty on local authorities in England to assist people threatened with homelessness within 56 days and to assess, prevent and relieve homelessness for all eligible applicants including single homeless people from April 2018. In short, no one should be turned away.

=== January 2018 report ===
In January 2018, it was reported that the number of homeless people sleeping on the streets in England had reached its highest level on record. The government's official figures showed that on any given night in autumn 2017, over 4,500 people were sleeping on the streets in England. The number had been shown to have increased by 73% over the last three years. The national charity for homeless people in the UK, Crisis, said the true number of those sleeping rough in England was far greater than the government's official figures, placing the number of people sleeping rough in England alone as over 8,000.

=== January to March 2023 report ===
In the January to March 2023 figures reported by the UK government it was revealed that homelessness in England had reached record levels, with 104,510 households in England in temporary accommodation.

=== May 2024 OECD report ===
In May 2024 the Organisation for Economic Co-operation and Development (OECD) published a report detailing the number of people experiencing homelessness as reported by public authorities in OECD and EU countries. The report found that Britain had the highest rate of homelessness in the developed world.

=== December 2024 Shelter report ===
A report by the charity Shelter in December 2024 stated that at least 354,000 people were homeless in England, an increase of 14% in a year. The charity's research also showed that 326,000 people are in temporary accommodation in England (a 17% increase in a year), 3,900 people in England are sleeping rough on any given night (an increase of 27%) and on top of these figures a further 16,600 single people in England are in hostels or other homeless accommodation.

=== February 2025 ===
In February 2025, research commissioned by Crisis found that English councils' spending on emergency accommodation for homeless families rose by 78% in the year to March 2024. Researchers also found that the total households eligible for homelessness support increased by 9% to almost 325,000 in 2023–24.

=== November 2025 ===
In November 2025, the charity Crisis said that "around 189,000 families and individuals who faced the worst forms of homelessness such as rough sleeping, sofa surfing and living in tents were not included in official statistics", regarding homeless people in England. It also said that "the number of people facing the worst forms of homelessness has grown by a fifth since 2022 and now stands at around 300,000".

== Homelessness advice ==
Practical advice regarding homelessness can be obtained through a number of major non-governmental organisations including,

- Citizens Advice Bureaus and some other charities also offer free legal advice in person, by telephone, or by email, from qualified lawyers and others operating on a pro bono basis
- Shelter provides extensive advice about homelessness and other housing problems on their website, and from the telephone number given there, including about rights and legal situations.
- In an emergency, a person contacts a local council.

== See also ==
- Homelessness in Scotland
- Homelessness in Wales
- Homelessness in the United Kingdom
