= Simon Community =

Charity for homeless people

A regular street cafe is run at St Giles in the Fields

Community transport

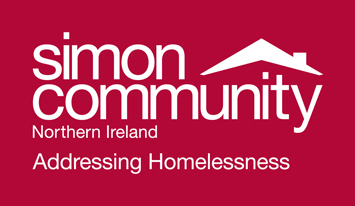

The Simon Community is a charity which helps homeless people, taking its name from Simon of Cyrene (hence sometimes known as the Cyreneans). It was founded in 1963 by Anton Wallich-Clifford, who had encountered many homeless people while working for the Probation Service at Bow Street Magistrates' Court in London, England. Wallich-Clifford was influenced by the work of Dorothy Day and her Catholic Worker Movement in the United States, and his original vision was to establish a farm and community in Sussex. However, local protests prevented this, and the organisation developed as a chain of houses and night shelters run by local volunteers. The Simon Community was co-founded by political activist Eddie Linden.

A trust was established to manage the affairs of the charity, but its administration was weak. Attempts were made to transform the organisation into a decentralised federation of homelessness bodies: the Cyrenian Federation and Homes for Homeless People.

Anton Wallich-Clifford died in 1978, but the original community continues where it is based and active in London.

== Ireland ==
In Ireland, the Simon Communities were founded by a group of Trinity College and University College Dublin students in 1969. It now operates all over Ireland, but particularly in Cork, Dublin, Dundalk, and Galway. These organisations partly (about 50%) fund themselves by hosting a number of charity initiatives and events such as the Dublin Fun Run. The remainder of funding comes from service contracts with government to provide homeless housing. In 2009, Dublin Simon celebrated its 40th anniversary.

== See also ==
- St Mungo's – a large charity for the homeless founded by a Simon Community volunteer.
- Museum of Homelessness
