= Gatekeeping (UK housing term) =

Gatekeeping is a term in British housing law which describes when a Council refuses to accept a homelessness application and/or provide accommodation when they have a legal duty to do so. Pressure for Councils to engage in "gatekeeping" can be the result of the high cost of providing temporary accommodation or there simply not being enough housing within a borough to accommodate homeless applicants. Gatekeeping practices of some local authorities have been challenged by judicial review.

== Examples ==
In 2015 Inside Housing reported that Southwark Council admitted to 'poor practices' including forcing applicants to prove that they are homeless through no fault of their own and requiring that a person be unemployed in order for the Council to provide interim accommodation.

== Litigation ==
In R (on the application of IA) v City of Westminster Council [2013] Westminster City Council were criticised for gatekeeping by HHJ Anthony Thornton QC.

“Where, as in this case, it appears that the applicant is depressed, alone, unable readily to cope with day-to-day living tasks, unemployed and possibly unemployable, has no settled links with England or the English way of life and has minimal support mechanisms at his disposal, the inquiries would be expected to extend to a detailed inquiry into the applicant’s way of life prior to his homelessness……it would have been impossible for any of these inquiries to be undertaken in this case during the initial screening interview.”

== Criticism ==
Caroline Davey of the charity Shelter has criticised 'gatekeeping'. The campaign group Shelter have stated that some authorities prevent homeless applicants from having their right to accommodation under the homelessness legislation due to 'gatekeeping'.
