= Booker T. Washington School (Tampa) =

High school for African Americans

Coordinates: 27.9588°N 82.4500°W

Booker T. Washington School was the first high school for African Americans in Tampa, Florida. The original school opened as a junior high school and expanded to include a high school program. It closed in 1971 in the wake of desegregation. An elementary school in Tampa is named for it.

A.J. Shootes was the school's first principal and Blanche Armwood Beatty was supervisor of Negro schools of Hillsbourgh County. Her firing of Shootes was controversial.

Benjamin Elijah Mays of Tampa's Urban League wrote about African American audience members of a pageant held at Tampa Bay Casino being relegated to the balcony. The casino was city owned.

There was also a Booker T. Washington School in New Port Richey, North of Tampa.

Clemmie James and Ethel Jones, former teachers at the school, were interviewed about their experiences.

A historical marker is at the site of the original school in Ybor City. The University of South Florida Libraries have a copy of the school's 1928 yearbook.

The elementary school is now behind the Robert W. Saunders Sr. Public Library. It was a middle school, but in 2005 it became an elementary school. The school mascot is the hornet.
