= National Public Housing Museum =

Museum in Chicago, USA

Coordinates: 41°52′10.7″N 87°39′35.5″W

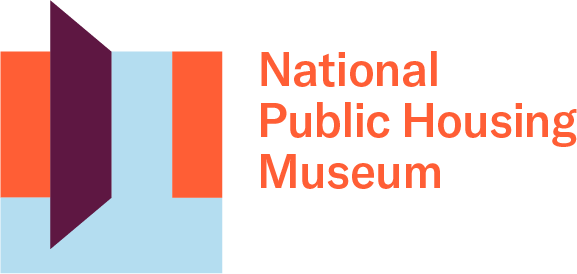
- Established: April 4, 2025
- Location: 919 South Ada Street; Chicago, Illinois 60607; United States
- Website: nphm.org

The National Public Housing Museum is a historical institution at 919 S Ada St. in Chicago, Illinois. The museum is located in the last remaining building of the Jane Addams Homes of ABLA Homes, and features an oral history archive, public programming, and an entrepreneurship hub. Exhibitions include three restored apartments of families who lived in the Jane Addams homes. The building that the museum is contained within opened in 1938 as the first federal government housing project in Chicago. It housed thousands of families over six decades and has been vacant since 2002.

== History ==
The movement for conservation of a public housing building began in the 1990s with the announcement of the Plan for Transformation, a Chicago Housing Authority initiative to demolish 23,000 units of public housing and replace them with mixed-income housing. Residents, led by Deverra Beverly, a former commissioner for the Chicago Housing Authority, began and led the movement for the creation of a memorialization of their presence. Beverly and other public housing residents approached Sunny Fischer, a philanthropy professional and former public housing resident herself, with their proposal for a museum. Along the way, CHA residents were joined by "civic leaders, preservationists, historians, and cultural experts who also wanted to create a new architectural landmark to recognize an important historic site." This group came together to preserve and transform the current site of the museum, originally designed by a team of architects led by John Holabird. As the project moved forward, the museum maintained a commitment to uplifting the voices and narratives of public housing residents, and includes public housing residents as about a third of its board. The museum was in development between 2007–2024, working and presenting events at a workspace at 625 Kingsbury St. The museum on Taylor St. & Ada St. opened in April 2025.

== Exhibits, collections and programming ==
The mission of the museum is to “promote, interpret, and propel housing as a human right”. This mission manifests in the museum’s oral history-focused approach to storytelling and community development and programming. The museum’s exhibitions and collections include an archive of oral histories of public housing residents, three restored apartments of three diverse (One Russian Jewish, one Italian-American, and one African American) families that lived in the public housing based on the oral histories of Inez Medor, members of the Rizzi family, and Rev. Marshall Hatch Sr., and a community space for discussion and interpretation. One unit includes a presentation on redlining, with visuals by local shadow-puppet theater Manual Cinema and a script by Princeton University scholar Keeanga-Yamahtta Taylor. Five current public housing residents serve as museum "ambassadors" to lead education programs and guide tours.

The "REC Room" exhibit features records by musicians who lived in public housing, including Jimi Hendrix, Bobby Brown, Elvis Presley, Barbra Streisand and members of the Wu-Tang Clan, many of which were donated by co-curator DJ Spinderella, a founding member of Salt-N-Pepa who is also a former public housing resident.

Another exhibit highlights the American sitcom Good Times, which was set in Chicago's Cabrini-Green public housing development. This exhibit incorporated input from Cabrini-Green residents as to which episodes would be available to screen.

Prior to opening, the museum served largely as a “museum in the streets” and hosted events like neighborhood storytelling and poetry readings, beautification projects at the site of the museum, and panels across the country. In 2017, National Public Housing Museum has partnered with Oral History Summer School to help train a group of activists, organizers, students, and artists in how to collect and utilize the medium of oral history, while additionally expanding the museum’s archival collection of oral histories. This Corps of oral historians gathered the first set of oral history interviews, over 100, between 2017–2021. In 2022, the museum launched its own training program curriculum, the Beauty Turner Academy of Oral History, which brings together organizers, memory workers, and artists with meaningful connections to public housing to learn the skills and ethics of oral history. Graduates of the Beauty Turner Academy training and apprenticeship then have the opportunity to join the museum's Oral History Collective as contractors, collecting and processing interviews for the archive, some of which is available on their Public Oral History Archive. Some of the Collective is also a part of the museum's Archive Working Group, designing and refining the policies, best practices, documentation, and presentation of the Archive, which holds over 200 interviews as of late 2026. As a member of the International Coalition of Sites of Conscience, the museum holds a responsibility to not only historicize its focus but also connect the focus to current struggles and initiatives.

The museum used the examples of the Apartheid Museum, District Six Museum, the Tenement Museum and the Jane Addams Hull-House Museum as inspiration. In December of 2025, the Chicago Tribune designated the museum's staff as Chicagoans of the Year for Museums.

== See also ==
- Museum of Homelessness
