= St Mungo's (charity) =

English homelessness charity

St Mungo Community Housing Association
- Abbreviation: St Mungo's
- Type: Registered charity
- Registration no.: 1149085
- Headquarters: London, England
- Coordinates: 51.507727°N 0.067685°W
- Region served: England
- Volunteers: 570 (in 2024)
- Website: mungos.org

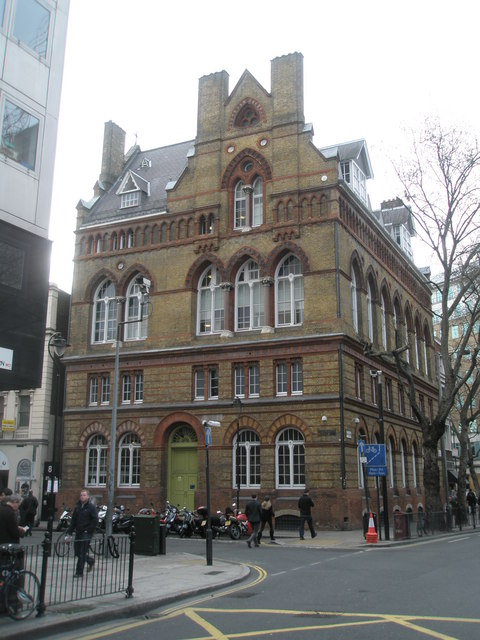
St Mungo's hostel in Covent Garden at the junction of Endell Street and High Holborn. The building was formerly a national school and now accommodates 53 homeless people, providing training for a period of up to two years to try to get them into work.

St Mungo's (St Mungo's Community Housing Association) is a charity registered in England that helps people experiencing homelessness. It currently operates in London, Bristol, Oxford, Bournemouth, Christchurch and Poole, Brighton, and Reading.

== Projects ==
The charity has pioneered a variety of novel programmes and initiatives.

=== Accommodation ===
St Mungo's operates a number of accommodation services for people who have experienced homelessness or rough sleeping:

==== Emergency Accommodation ====
St Mungo's operates a number of emergency accommodation projects across its regions. During the COVID-19 pandemic, it was a part of the Everyone In initiative, which established additional hostels to support people who were sleeping on the streets into safe spaces.

==== Housing First ====
Housing First is a programme designed to support people with complex needs who have been unable to sustain a long-term home. It provides a tenancy as a first step, with intensive and flexible support to help people address their needs at their own pace.

=== Construction Skills and Multi-skills ===
The Construction Skills and Multi-skills projects at St Mungo's train and prepare clients for finding work in the construction sector, providing a City and Guilds qualification. It also grants access to work placements and apprenticeships through partnered local employers.

=== "Putting Down Roots" project ===
Jonathan Trustram showing the use of self-seeding plants by the Putting Down Roots project in the Mint Street park. These guided tours formed part of the Chelsea Fringe in 2012.

The Putting Down Roots project enables people experiencing homelessness to develop practical gardening skills and other horticultural features. It was started by Martin Snowden for St Mungo's in 2000 and has been sponsored and supported by a variety of partners. In 2012, Jonathan Trustram lead the development of gardens including St John's Church, Waterloo.

In 2022, members of Putting Down Roots were involved in a garden developed for the RHS Chelsea Flower Show by Cityscapes UK. The "urban pocket park" secured a silver medal at the show.

== Previous Projects ==
=== "LifeWorks" project ===
The LifeWorks project started in 2008, providing psychodynamics psychotherapy to homeless people, especially those who are addicted to drugs or alcohol.

=== Street stories ===
In 2009, for the 40th anniversary of the organisation, a project was started to record the oral history of the homeless. Six clients were given training in this and they then interviewed other clients, recording the history of their time on the streets and other recollections. These were then presented in an exhibition at the LSE and the results were then archived in Southwark Library.

== History ==
St. Mungo's Community began as a splinter group from The Simon Community which was started by a former probation officer Anton Wallich-Clifford and was unique among organisations for its success in alcoholic recoveries. This was essentially due to its controversial approach of allowing drinking actually on the premises. The lease for the East End shelter in Sclater street was ending and it was at a time when shortage of money drove the Simon Community into constant reorganisation. However, due to the services of Conservative MP James Allason, the chairman of the East End house managed to break through the almost impenetrable bureaucracy that surrounded the London County Council. Unaware that it was for a new charity they offered the short lease on a house in Home Road, Wandsworth, which was due to be demolished in two years time.

Harry Stone had a choice of two people for the job of warden. One was the warden of the closing Simon wet house and the other was a young ambitious worker at the Simon headquarters. The warden at the time was a reformed alcoholic and it was therefore felt he might not be able to withstand the considerable pressure he would likely be under. Jim Horne was chosen. Horne agreed to become the new Chairman while Harry Stone became secretary, treasurer and fund raiser.

Horne ridiculed the suggestion the enterprise should be called The Home Road Hostel and pressed for the name St. Mungo's. Being Scottish, he believed the powers of Glasgow Cathedral might be persuaded to make an ample donation if it was named after their patron saint. It proved to be a false hope. But otherwise Horne's enthusiasm and ability drove St. Mungo to increasing success. Among his early helpers was Graham Parr who in turn broke away to start up the original Vauxhall Broadway hostel. Due to the enlightened support of Wandsworth Council, even though they had never been officially informed of the occupation in Home Road, the Mayor opened the second house, which was also in Home Road.

St. Mungos gained the interest of the Department of Health and Social Services and Jim Horne persuaded the Head of the department and the Minister Sir Keith Joseph to spend an evening on the soup run. The department subsequently offered major financial support so that the Community could become an experimental embryo for further possible development. The organisation was later completely reorganised. Qualified accountants, medical practitioners and psychiatrists were appointed as additional trustees. Out of this it soon became clear that whenever either of the original Trustees held opposing views or questioned Horne's dealings, the new Trustees backed Horne since he had the responsibility for the daily running.

In the late 1960s, it faltered. Its management started cutting back and so, in May 1969, its soup run was to be ended. The soup run was a nightly distribution of soup in six locations in London's West End where homeless rough sleepers or "dossers" gathered. This was provided by Wandsworth Council for a nominal rent and in 1970, the council provided three more houses nearby. The fourth house was used as an office by the developing organisation.

== Hostels ==
Splits and mergers. The original trust is now Hestia Housing and Support while the separate housing association became the main St Mungo's charity which merged with Broadway Housing in 2015 becoming for a short period St Mungo's Broadway before reverting to St Mungo's in 2016.

A large hostel, accommodating up to 200 people, was started in a disused Marmite factory in Vauxhall in 1973. This large building had previously been notorious for the strong smell of the production process. In the same year, another large hostel was opened on a short-life basis in Suffolk Street, off the Strand, formerly the Charing Cross Hospital. The hospital had been relocated to Fulham and Jim Horne negotiated cheap terms for occupation of the old building with the Greater London Council pending its conversion to a police station.

There was a schism in the organisation in 1979. Jim Horne left and the organisation split into three. The Charing Cross hostel was managed by a new charity — St Mungo's Community Housing Association until closed due to its insanitary condition and replaced by a refurbished building in Endell Street, Covent Garden. The Marmite hostel became Bondway Shelter, registered as a separate housing association. The St Mungo's Community Trust then focussed upon the soup run and partnered with other organisations, such as the Shepherd's Bush Housing Association, to open a hostel in Fulham. In 1980, the soup run was passed on to the Bondway organisation and the original trust now operates as Hestia Housing and Support. It was renamed to avoid confusion with the St Mungo's Community Housing Association, which operates as "St Mungo's".

Today St Mungo's has grown and developed a wide range of services becoming the largest charity dealing with the homeless in London. In 2010, it provided a bed for over 1500 people each night. By 2011, they managed over a hundred sites across southern England providing accommodation in hostels, group houses and independent units or offering other services to the homeless.

== Controversies ==
=== Home Office compliance teams ===
In March 2018, St Mungo's confirmed to The Guardian newspaper that it had cooperated with Home Office immigration, compliance and enforcement (ICE) teams, who were responsible for identifying rough sleepers who were deemed as living in the UK illegally. The North East London Migrant Action group said: "The role of homelessness charities should be to uphold the rights of vulnerable people. St Mungo's have forfeited the trust of asylum seekers and other migrants who sleep rough by working with the Home Office who have people deported from the UK."

While acknowledging that their outreach teams had worked with the Home Office, St Mungo's said that their role was to protect the rights of the homeless, stating now on their website: "We do not share any information about our clients with the Home Office without the client's full and informed consent. We only ask for consent to share information with the Home Office in very limited circumstances where the client has immigration advice in place and only for the purpose of achieving a positive outcome for the client. St Mungo's is not registered with the Home Office Rough Sleeping Support Service and will not participate in this scheme.''

=== Pay dispute ===
From 27 June 2023 workers at St Mungo's started an indefinite strike in a dispute over pay. The workers accused management of a dereliction of duty towards the homeless and the charity's own staff. The strike action led by Unite the Union lasted for three months, eventually leading to a 10.7% pay increase. Staff returned to work on 4 September 2023.

== See also ==
- Homelessness in England
