= Crisis (charity) =

UK national charity for homeless people

- Founded: 1967
- Purpose: Delivering services to people in the UK experiencing homelessness and campaigning for change on their behalf. "Together we can end Homelessness"
- Location: London, United Kingdom
- Website: crisis.org.uk

Crisis is the UK national charity for people experiencing homelessness. The charity offers year-round education, employment, housing and well-being services from centres in East London, Newcastle, Oxford, Edinburgh, South Wales, Croydon, Brent and Merseyside, called Crisis Skylight Centres.

As well as year-round services the charity runs Crisis at Christmas, which since 1972 has been offering food, warmth, companionship and support services to homeless people over the Christmas period. In 2016 almost 4,600 homeless people visited Crisis at Christmas.

Since its inception Crisis has been a campaigning organisation, lobbying government for political change that prevents and mitigates homelessness based on research commissioned and undertaken by the organisation.

Matt Downie OBE has been the chief executive of Crisis since 2022.

== History ==
According to Crisis, the charity was "founded in 1967 in response to the shocking Ken Loach film Cathy Come Home shown the previous year, and a publicity campaign led by reforming Conservatives William Shearman and Ian Macleod highlighting the plight of homeless people". The drama-documentary Cathy Come Home was first broadcast by the BBC the previous November.

Since the 1960s Crisis has evolved to meet the changing needs of single homeless people, campaigning for change and delivering services to help people find a route out of their homelessness across the UK.

It was one of the seven charities nominated by Prince Harry and Meghan Markle to receive donations in lieu of wedding presents when the couple married on 19 May 2018.

== Crisis Skylight Centres ==
There are 67 Skylight Centres covering East London (Aldgate), Brent, Croydon, Oxford, Merseyside, South Wales, Newcastle, Edinburgh and Birmingham. Crisis Skylight Centres are accredited education, training and employment centres, offering practical and creative workshops in supportive and inspiring environments, together with formal learning opportunities that lead to qualifications and finding work.

Crisis Skylight London opened in 2002, with a Crisis Skylight Cafe social enterprise opening on the same site on Commercial Street in East London in 2004. In 2007, Crisis Skylight Newcastle opened, followed by Crisis Skylight Birmingham and Crisis Skylight Edinburgh in 2010, Crisis Skylight Oxford and Crisis Skylight Merseyside in 2011 and Crisis Skylight Croydon in 2017.

== Crisis at Christmas ==
Since 1972 Crisis at Christmas has been offering food, warmth, companionship and services to people experiencing homelessness in London over the Christmas period. The project is run almost entirely by around 10,500 volunteers, making it the largest volunteer-led event in the UK. In 2016, about 4,600 homeless people come through the doors. Since 2020, Crisis at Christmas has operated in three hotels across London, accommodating 450 people who would otherwise be sleeping rough over the Christmas period. The charity also runs four temporary day centres in London for up to 4,800 people in insecure living situations.

Services offered at Christmas include internet access, entertainment, food and drink, healthcare, opticians, podiatry, dentistry, natural healing and hairdressing.

During the key winter period Crisis at Christmas has centres in London, Edinburgh, Newcastle and Birmingham.

== Campaigns ==
Crisis is the national charity for people experiencing homelessness. The charity has stated: "We know that homelessness is not inevitable. We know that together we can end it."

In October 2011, Crisis launched a campaign to improve the assistance and support provided by Local Authorities to single homeless people.

In light of the escalating homelessness crisis in the UK and the severe reduction in the availability of social housing, Crisis announced a significant shift in its operational model in 2024. For the first time in its 60-year history, the organisation decided to become a landlord and direct provider of social housing.

Crisis Chief Executive, Matt Downie, described the scenario as "catastrophic," citing an organisation study (conducted by Heriot-Watt University) which indicated that almost 300,000 households in England experienced the most acute forms of homelessness in 2024, a 45% increase since 2012. This figure highlighted the failure of traditional systems (councils and housing associations) to meet the demand for low-income individuals.

The organisation launched a fundraising appeal with the initial goal of acquiring and managing at least one thousand homes. This initiative was conceived as a direct action to demonstrate that the fundamental solution to homelessness is secure, permanent housing. The new stock will be allocated to high-needs individuals, with initial pilot plans in London and Newcastle, implementing the intensive support model of "Housing First." In taking this step, Crisis is emulating the earliest housing associations founded by Victorian philanthropists in the 19th century, signalling a regression in the British social housing system.
