= Baguio City Federation of the Sangguniang Kabataan =

Special youth legislature in Baguio

The Sangguniang Kabataan Baguio City Federation is a special youth legislature that initiates programs, policies, and projects for youth development. It is composed of 124 members serving as SK Chairmen of their respective barangays.
