= Positive youth development =

Type of youth development program

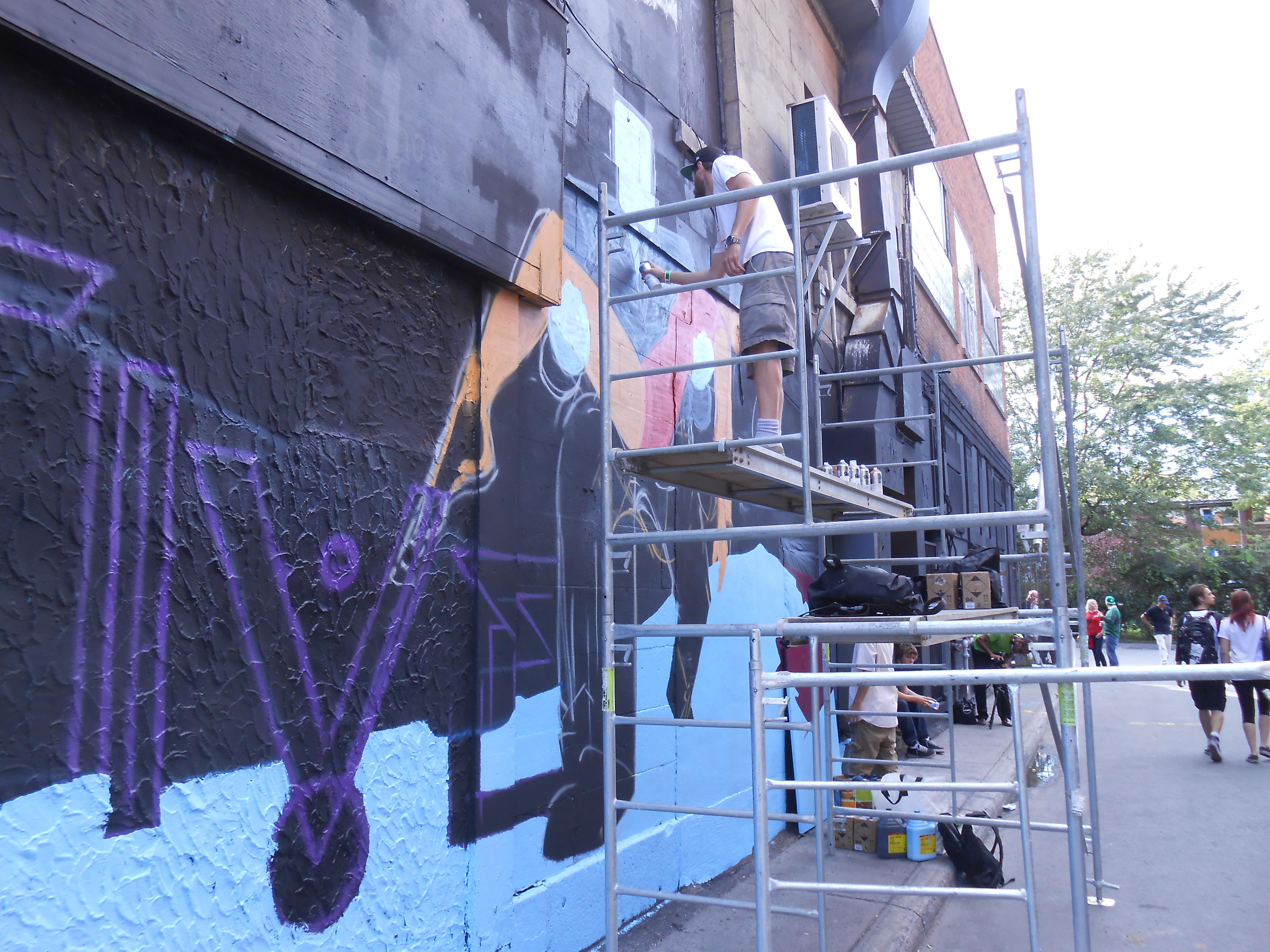
Youth participating in Under Pressure, a North American graffiti festival using positive youth development principles

Positive youth development (PYD) programs are designed to optimize youth developmental progress. This is sought through a positivistic approach that emphasizes the inherent potential, strengths, and capabilities youth hold. PYD differs from other approaches within youth development work in that it rejects an emphasis on trying to correct what is considered wrong with children's behavior or development, renouncing a problem-oriented lens. Instead, it seeks to cultivate various personal assets and external contexts known to be important to human development.

Youth development professionals live by the motto originally coined by Karen Pittman, "problem free is not fully prepared", as they work to grow youth into productive members of society. Seen through a PYD lens, young people are not regarded as "problems to be solved"; rather, they are seen as assets, allies, and agents of change who have much to contribute in solving the problems that affect them most. Programs and practitioners seek to empathize with, educate, and engage children in productive activities in order to help youth "reach their full potential". Though the field is still growing, PYD has been used across the world to address social divisions, such as gender and ethnic differences.

== Background ==
Positive youth development originated from ecological systems theory to focus on the strengths of adolescents. Central to this theory is the understanding that there are multiple environments that influence children. Similar to the principles of positive psychology, the theory of PYD suggests that "if young people have mutually beneficial relations with the people and institutions of their social world, they will be on the way to a hopeful future marked by positive contributions to self, family, community, and civil society."

The major catalyst of positive youth development came as a response to the punitive methods of the "traditional youth development" approach. The traditional approach makes a connection between the changes occurring during adolescent years and the beginning or peaking of several public health and social problems, including homicide, suicide, substance use and abuse, sexually transmitted infections, teen and unplanned pregnancies. This connection was made infamous by developmental psychologist G. Stanley Hall who described adolescence as a time of "storm and stress".

Another aspect of the traditional approach is that many professionals and mass media portrayed adolescents as inevitable problems that simply needed to be fixed. This "fixing" motivated the "solving" of single-problem behavior, such as substance abuse. Specific evidence of this "problem-centered" model is present across professional fields that deal with young people. Language that reflects this approach includes the “at-risk child” and “the juvenile delinquent”. Many connections can also be made to the current U.S. criminal justice model that favors punishment as opposed to prevention.

The concept and practice of positive youth development "grew from the dissatisfaction with a predominant view that underestimated the true capacities of young people by focusing on their deficits rather than their development potential." PYD asserts that youth have inherent strengths and if given opportunities, support, and acknowledgement they can thrive. Encouraging the positive development of adolescents can ease the transition into healthy adulthood. Therefore, emphasis is placed on asset-building. Crucial to the outlining of asset-building is Peter Benson's list of developmental assets. This list is divided into two categories: internal assets (positive individual characteristics) and external assets (community characteristics). Furthermore, research findings point out that PYD provides a sense of “social belonging”, participatory motivation in academic-based and community activities for positive educational outcomes, a sense of social responsibility and civic engagement, and participation in organized activities that would aid in self-development.

== Goals ==
PYD focuses on the active promotion of optimal human development, rather than on the scientific study of age related change, distinguishing it from the study of child development or adolescent development. or as solely a means of avoiding risky behaviors. Rather than grounding its developmental approach in the presence of adversity, risk or challenge, a PYD approach considers the potential and capacity of each individual young person. A hallmark of these programs is that they are based on the concept that children and adolescents have strengths and abilities unique to their developmental stage and that they are not merely "inadequate" or "undeveloped" adults. Lerner and colleagues write: "The goal of the positive youth development perspective is to promote positive outcomes. This idea is in contrast to a perspective that focuses on punishment and the idea that adolescents are broken".

Positive youth development is both a vision, an ideology and a new vocabulary for engaging with youth development. Its tenets can be organized into the 5 C: competence, confidence, connection, character, and caring. When these 5 Cs are present, the 6th C of "contribution" is realized.

=== Key features ===
Positive youth development programs typically recognize contextual variability in youths' experience and in what is considered healthy or optimal development for youth in different settings or cultures. This cultural sensitivity reflects the influence of Bronfenbrenner's ecological systems theory. The influence of ecological systems theory is also seen on the emphasis many youth development programs place on the interrelationship of different social contexts through which the individual moves (e.g. family, peers, school, work, and leisure). This means that PYD seeks to involve youth in multiple kinds of prosocial relationships to promote the young person's wellness, safety, and healthy maturation. Such engagement may be sought "within their communities, schools, organizations, peer groups, and families". As a result, PYD seeks to build "community capacity". The community is involved in order to facilitate a sense of security and identity. Likewise, youth are encouraged to be involved in the community.

The University of Minnesota's Keys to Quality Youth Development summarizes eight key elements of programs that successfully promote youth development. Such programs are physically and emotionally safe, give youth a sense of belonging and ownership, foster self-worth, facilitates discovery of their "selves" (identities, interests, strengths), foster high-quality and supportive relationships with peers and adults, help youth recognize conflicting values and develop their own, foster the development of new skills, creates a fun environment, and develops hope for the future.

In addition, programs that employ PYD principles generally have one or more of the following features:

- promote bonding
- foster resilience
- promote social, emotional, cognitive, behavioral, and moral competence
- encourages service
- foster self-determination
- foster spirituality
- foster self-efficacy
- foster clear and positive identity
- foster belief in the future
- sets expectations
- facilitation of identity creation
- provide recognition for positive behavior and opportunities for pro-social involvement
- promote empowerment
- promotes responsibility
- foster pro-social norms

== Addressing stereotypes and inequality ==
=== Gender ===
Positive youth development principles can be used to address gender inequities through the promotion of programs such as "Girls on the Run". Physical activity-based programs like "Girls on the Run" are being increasingly used around the world for their ability to encourage psychological, emotional, and social development for youth. "Girls on the Run" enhances this type of physical activity program by specifically targeting female youth in an effort to reduce the gendered view of a male-dominated sports arena. "Girls on the Run" is a non-profit organization begun in 1996 that distributes a 12-week training program to help girls prepare for a 5k running competition. This particular program is made available to 3rd through 5th grade female students throughout the United States and Canada to be implemented in either school or community-based settings.

Another example of positive youth development principles being used to target youth gender inequities can be seen in that of a participatory diagramming approach in Kibera, Kenya. This community development effort enabled participants to feel safe discussing their concerns regarding gender inequities in the community with the dominant male group. This approach also enabled youth to voice their needs and identify potential solutions related to topics like HIV/AIDS and family violence.

=== Ethnic minorities in the United States ===
Positive youth development can be used to combat negative stereotypes surrounding youth of minority ethnic groups in the U.S. after-school programs have been directly geared to generate increased participation for African American and Latino youth with a focus on academic achievement and increasing high school graduation rates. Studies have found programs targeting African American youth are more effective when they work to bolster a sense of their cultural identity. PYD has even been used to help develop and strengthen the cultural identities of American Indian and Alaskan Native youth. PYD methods have been used to provide a supportive setting in which to engage youth in traditional activities. Various programs have been implemented related to sports, language, and arts and crafts. Sports programs that use positive youth development principles are commonly referred to as "sports-based youth development" (SBYD) programs. SBYD incorporates positive youth development principles into program and curricula design and coach training.

Many factors, such as low income, redlining, racial barriers and racial prejudice, mental health illness or challenges and substance abuse, have impacted ethnic minorities in the United States. Youth who are at-risk of falling into negative behaviors need positive youth development programs to help them avoid going to juvenile system. Research shows that there is improvement in youth's behavior with PYD, "Programs consisting of repressive and punitive elements were ineffective, whereas programs targeting positive social relations of at-risk youth (providing informal and supportive social control) proved to be successful". When PYD is incorporated in after-school programs, youth receive academic support and mental health services. PYD also provides mentors who lend support to youth and encourage them to believe in themselves, despite what the system and society tells them.

== Models of implementation ==
=== Asia ===
The key constructs of PYD listed above have been generally accepted throughout the world with some regional distinctions. For example, a Chinese Positive Youth Development Scale has been developed to conceptualize how these features are applicable to Chinese youth. The Chinese Positive Youth Development Scale was used as a measure in a study of Chinese youth in secondary schools in Hong Kong that indicated positive youth development has a direct impact on life satisfaction and reducing problem behavior for Chinese youth. One specific example of PYD implementation is seen in the project "P.A.T.H.S. (Positive Adolescent Training through Holistic Social Programmes) to Adulthood: A Jockey Club Youth Enhancement Scheme". This program targets junior secondary school students in Hong Kong (grades 7 through 9 in the North American System). The program is composed of two terms, the first of which is a structured curriculum focusing on the 15 PYD constructs and designed for all students as a "universal prevention initiative". The Tier 2 Program is a more selective prevention model directly targeting students with greater psychosocial needs identified by the school social work service providers. The label "at-risk" is intentionally avoided because the term denotes a very negative stigma in Chinese culture, and therefore discourages participation in the program. Although Chinese social work agencies commonly target students with greater psychosocial needs, these PYD programs have rarely undergone thorough systemic evaluation and documentation.

=== Europe ===
In Portugal, the utility of positive youth development principles in sporting contexts is beginning to be recognized. Several athletic-based programs have been implemented in the country, but more research is necessary to determine their effectiveness at this point.

=== Latin America and the Caribbean ===
Positive youth development has also been seen in the form of youth volunteer service throughout Latin America and the Caribbean. From Mexico and the Caribbean to Central and South America, this form of implementation has been acknowledged for encouraging both personal and community development, while oftentimes contributing to poverty reduction. It has furthermore been seen as a way of promoting civil engagement through various service opportunities in communities.

Positive youth development efforts can be seen in the work of the United States Agency for International Development (USAID) in collaboration with various regional governments and the private sector across Latin America and the Caribbean. This work has focused on providing broader educational options, skills training, and opportunities for economically disadvantaged youth to obtain apprenticeships. The ¡Supérate! Centers across El Salvador are one example, as they are supported by USAID in combination with private companies and foundations, and offer expanded education for high-performing students from poorer economic backgrounds. As of 2011, there were 7 centers in El Salvador and USAID expressed plans to expand this model across Central America. In Brazil, the Jovem Plus program offers high-demand skills training for youth in disadvantaged communities in Rio de Janeiro and the northeastern area of the nation. Other programs include the "Youth Movement against Violence" in Guatemala and "Youth Upliftment through Employment" in Jamaica.

=== New Zealand ===
==== Tu Tangata ====
In the late 1970s, high profile entertainer Sir Howard Morrison was a consultant on positive youth development for Te Puni Kōkiri (Department Of Maori Affairs) and used his profile to improve self esteem, promote achievement and encourage participation in higher levels of learning by young Māori, visiting many schools in the process. He developed wānanga (education programmes) on marae and used his entertainment skills to promote the Tu Tangata, or ‘Stand Tall’ programme. Morrison’s nationwide Tu Tangata tour in 1979 brought the Howard Morrison Quartet together again, with Toni Williams and the Morrison family joining the tour.

==== Oranga Tamariki Act 1989 ====
The Children's and Young People's Well-being Act 1989 is an Act of the New Zealand Parliament that was passed in 1989 to "promote the well-being of children, young persons, and their families and family groups." In June 2017, the parliament passed amendment legislation renaming the bill the Oranga Tamariki Act 1989.

==== Restorative justice ====
According to Howard Zehr, "Two people have made very specific and profound contributions to practices in the field – the Indigenous people of Canada and the United States, and the Maori of New Zealand... [I]n many ways, Restorative Justice represents a validation of values and practices that were characteristic of many indigenous groups," whose traditions were "often discounted and repressed by western colonial powers".

In 2002, the New Zealand Government passed the Sentencing Act 2002, the Victims' Rights Act 2002, the Parole Act 2002, and later, the Corrections Act 2004, which incorporated Restorative Justice as an alternative to conventional sentencing.

Its guidelines state:

A restorative justice conference is an informal, facilitated meeting between a victim, offender, support people and any other approved people, such as community representatives or interpreters.

Offenders attending a restorative justice conference have the chance to:

1. take responsibility for their offending
2. apologise to their victim
3. decide how to put right the harm they caused
4. find ways to make sure they don't reoffend

In her 2019 evaluation of the programme, political scientist and litigation lawyer Sarah Mikva Pfander found that the Restorative Justice programme had fallen short of expectations, and needed far more support from the legislature and from the community if it was to succeed.

=== United States of America ===
The rates of juvenile offenders were increasing, as youth were steering to bad habits affecting their academic standing and outside of school. The rates of juvenile offenders affected the community's well-being, so it became a governmental issue to find positive development solutions for youth to behave well at schools and elsewhere. The government realized they would need to start working with youth at the school level, as youth who got suspended have a higher chance of getting involved in the juvenile system. One approach is under debate is the socio-emotional learning (SEL) program that consists of Monarch Room (MR) intervention, a trauma-informed alternative to school discipline. The MR was to promote socio-emotional regulation, and the staff were trained in counseling and trauma-informed to help the youth with sensory states, thoughts, feelings, and "subsequent behaviors". In a 10-year study, Grade 9 students had the highest use of the MR, and, on average, students used it five times a year. The program showed interest in the youth wanting support, and the introduction of MR led to a decrease in the use of school suspensions. However, there was no comparison group to help determine if the decreased levels of the School Disciplinary Act (SDA) were due to the MR initiative.

Another solution up for debate to reduce school suspension is the positive behavior interventions and supports framework (PBIS). This program worked in 3 tiers approach to improve school climate. Tier 1 is teaching the expectations to all students; tier 2 is target support for the small groups of students displaying challenging behavior; tier 3 is individually intervening when working with students with intense behavioral needs.PBIS did find a statistical difference between the schools using PBIS and not for reducing SDA for all students, particularly students with disability and BIPOC students. However, the researchers did acknowledge that using a PBIS framework does not significantly affect the most severe behaviors, e.g., weapons offenses, because, as an intervention, it does not target those types of incidents. PBIS is a proactive and preventative approach. The ratings from the participants were overwhelmingly positive; however, there are concerns about the time requirement to implement the study, which is worth exploring further.

An additional solution is restorative practices, which are associated with reduced suspension rates and suggest that school-based restorative practices are a promising approach to reducing exclusionary discipline outcomes. The practices are to build a positive school culture and environment. They focus on the problem and not blaming or punishing. To see the effectiveness of this study, they looked at interviews, focus groups, observations, school artifacts, and suspension data to determine the effectiveness of RJP. RJP uses responsive circles, mediations, and re-entry circles for students involved in conflict. They implement RJP to facilitate conflict resolution and remove policies that compete with these practices, i.e., punitive consequences.

== See also ==
- Comprehensive sex education
- Culture and positive psychology
- Growth mindset
- Positive education
- Youth services
- Youth intervention
