= Restorative justice =

Restitution with input from victims and offenders

In criminology, restorative justice is a method or ethos of criminal justice that seeks to repair harm after crime or violence by empowering the harmed (victims) and harming parties (offenders) to participate in a dialogue. In doing so, restorative justice practitioners work to ensure that offenders take responsibility for their actions, to understand the harm they have caused, to give them an opportunity to redeem themselves, and to discourage them from causing further harm. For victims, the goal is to give them an active role in the process and to reduce feelings of anxiety, unfairness and powerlessness. Restorative justice programmes are complementary to the criminal justice system, including retributive justice. In the matter of defining what "punishment" is, it has been argued that some cases of restorative justice constitute an alternative punishment to those atoning.

Through academic assessment, restorative justice has rendered positive results for both victims and offenders. Proponents argue that most studies suggest it makes offenders less likely to re-offend. A 2007 study also found that it had a higher rate of victim satisfaction and offender accountability than traditional methods of justice delivery. Its use has seen worldwide growth since the 1990s. Restorative justice inspired and is part of the wider study of restorative practices.

The literature summarises restorative justice practices as: victim-offender mediation, family group conferencing and circles. Their main differences between these key practices lie in the number and roles of participants. Victim-offender mediation involves meetings between the victim and the offender. Family group conferencing involves meetings with the victim, the offender and direct stakeholders such as their family and professionals supporting them including youth or social workers, the police or friends. Circles include the victim, the offender and representatives of the wider community.

Independently of the restorative justice practice, the overall goal is for participants to share their experience of what happened, to discuss who was harmed by the crime and how, and to create a consensus for what the offender can do to repair the harm from the offense. This may include a payment of money given from the offender to the victim, apologies and other amends, and other actions to compensate those affected and to prevent the offender from causing future harm. Founded upon the principle of equality, restorative justice practices are firmly rooted in the needs of the victim, as well as the offender, and thus their focus is on empowering both parties through power sharing leading to honest and equal dialogue towards resolution.

== Definition ==
The Restorative Justice (Prescribed Persons) (Scotland) Order 2021 (SSI 2021-40)

There are various definitions of restorative justice in the literature with some describing it as a "process", while others as an "ethos" and a way of living. For example, according to John Braithwaite, restorative justice is:

...a process where all stakeholders affected by an injustice have an opportunity to discuss how they have been affected by the injustice and to decide what should be done to repair the harm. With crime, restorative justice is about the idea that because crime hurts, justice should heal. It follows that conversations with those who have been hurt and with those who have inflicted the harm must be central to the process.

Although law professionals may have secondary roles in facilitating the restorative justice process, it is the citizens who must take up the majority of the responsibility in healing the pains caused by crime. The process of restorative justice thus shifts the responsibility for addressing crime.

In 2014, Carolyn Boyes-Watson from Suffolk University defined restorative justice as:

...a growing social movement to institutionalize peaceful approaches to harm, problem-solving and violations of legal and human rights. These range from international peacemaking tribunals such as the South Africa Truth and Reconciliation Commission to innovations within the criminal and juvenile justice systems, schools, social services and communities. Rather than privileging the law, professionals and the state, restorative resolutions engage those who are harmed, wrongdoers and their affected communities in search of solutions that promote repair, reconciliation and the rebuilding of relationships. Restorative justice seeks to build partnerships to reestablish mutual responsibility for constructive responses to wrongdoing within our communities. Restorative approaches seek a balanced approach to the needs of the victim, wrongdoer and community through processes that preserve the safety and dignity of all.

Reconciliation is one potential component of restorative justice. However, restorative justice does not necessarily involve reconciliation.

=== Difference from other approaches ===
According to American criminologist and professor Howard Zehr, restorative justice differs from traditional criminal justice in terms of the guiding questions it asks. In restorative justice, the questions are:

1. Who has been hurt?
2. What are their needs?
3. Whose obligations are these?
4. What are the causes?
5. Who has a stake in the situation?
6. What is the appropriate process to involve stakeholders in an effort to address causes and put things right?

In contrast, traditional criminal justice asks:

1. What laws have been broken?
2. Who did it?
3. What do the offender(s) deserve?

Others, however, have argued that there are several similarities between restorative justice and traditional criminal justice and that some cases of restorative justice constitute punishment from the perspectives of some positions on what punishment is.

Restorative justice is also different from the adversarial legal process or that of civil litigation.

As Braithwaite writes, "Court-annexed ADR (alternative dispute resolution) and restorative justice could not be philosophically further apart." While the former seeks to address only legally relevant issues and to protect both parties' rights, restorative justice aims at "expanding the issues beyond those that are legally relevant, especially into underlying relationships."

== History ==
=== History of the term ===
The phrase "restorative justice" has appeared in written sources since the first half of the nineteenth century. In fact, Gavrielides argued that the term restorative justice (επανορθωτικόν δίκαιον) was coined by Aristotle. According to Aristotle, restorative justice aims to restore αγαθά (goods) to individuals.

The modern usage of the term was introduced by Albert Eglash, who in 1977 described three different approaches to justice:

1. "retributive justice", based on punishment;
2. "distributive justice", involving therapeutic treatment of offenders;
3. "restorative justice", based on restitution with input from victims and offenders.

Nils Christie, further elaborated the term "restorative justice" in his 1977 article "Conflict as Property" Christie argued that restorative justice aims to return conflict to those who have been harmed or have harmed.

=== Precursors in Indigenous groups ===
According to Howard Zehr, "Two people have made very specific and profound contributions to practices in the field – the Indigenous people of Canada and the United States, and the Maori of New Zealand... [I]n many ways, restorative justice represents a validation of values and practices that were characteristic of many indigenous groups," whose traditions were "often discounted and repressed by western colonial powers". For example, in New Zealand, prior to European invasion, the Maori had a well-developed system called Utu that protected individuals, social stability, and the integrity of the group. Restorative justice (sometimes known in these contexts as circle justice) continues to be a feature of indigenous justice systems today.

=== Development of theory ===
Zehr's book Changing Lenses–A New Focus for Crime and Justice, first published in 1990, is credited with being "groundbreaking", as well as being one of the first to articulate a theory of restorative justice. The title of this book refers to providing an alternative framework for thinking about – or new lens for viewing – crime and justice. Changing Lenses juxtaposed a "retributive justice" framework, where crime is viewed as an offense against the state, with a restorative justice framework, where crime is viewed as a violation of people and relationships. The book made reference to the positive results of efforts in the late 1970s and 1980s at victim–offender mediation, pioneered in the United States by Howard Zehr, Ron Claassen and Mark Umbreit.

By the second half of the 1990s, the expression "restorative justice" had become popular, evolving to widespread usage by 2006. The restorative justice movement has attracted many segments of society, including "police officers, judges, schoolteachers, politicians, juvenile justice agencies, victim support groups, aboriginal elders, and mums and dads".

Contributing to the theoretical discourse on restorative justice, an African scholar/expert in restorative justice, Don John Omale profusely argues in his book how some social-psychological theories and afrocentric/indigenous principles could contribute significantly to the understanding and development of restorative justice theory.

Legal philosopher, Theo Gavrielides, argued that more needs to be done to justify normatively restorative justice. He argued that its implementation causes a different type of punishment, which he calls "restorative justice pain". He developed a philosophy aiming to justify this type of punishment. "Restorative justice is a powerful and painful tool that is morally problematic", he said. Similarly, Hon Sir Anthony Mason expressed his concerns that the contribution of restorative justice will remain limited until a clear philosophical framework is articulated to justify its practices.

=== Development of practice ===
In North America, the growth of restorative justice has been facilitated by NGOs dedicated to this approach to justice, such as the Victim Offender Mediation Association, as well as by the establishment of academic centers, such as the Center for Justice and Peacebuilding at Eastern Mennonite University in Virginia, the University of Minnesota's Center for Restorative Justice and Peacemaking, the Community Justice Institute at Florida Atlantic University, the Center for Peacemaking and Conflict Studies at Fresno Pacific University in California, the Center for Restorative Justice at the University of San Diego, and the Centre for Restorative Justice at Simon Fraser University in British Columbia, Canada. Members of the Mennonites and the social-action arm of their church-community, Mennonite Central Committee, were among the early proponents. "[T]he antinomian groups advocating and supporting restorative justice, such as the Mennonites (as well as Amish and Quaker groups), subscribe to principled pacifism and also tend to believe that restorative justice is much more humane than the punitive juvenile and criminal justice systems."

The development of restorative justice in continental Europe, especially the German speaking countries, Austria, Germany and Switzerland, is somewhat different from the Anglo-Saxon experience. For example, victim–offender mediation is just one model of restorative justice, but in the present European context it is the most important one. Restorative justice is not just a theory, but a practice-oriented attitude in dealing (not only) with criminal relevant conflicts. Some have argued that restorative justice may be moving towards restorative practice.

In October 2018, the Committee of Ministers of the Council of Europe adopted a recommendation to member states which recognised "the potential benefits of using restorative justice with respect to criminal justice systems" and encouraged member states to "develop and use restorative justice".

== Application ==
Restorative justice is being applied both within and outside the criminal justice system. Within the criminal justice system practices have been found at the police and prosecution stage, sentencing and court stage as well as within prison and probation. Outside of the criminal justice system, restorative justice is being applied in the community by NGOs, independent restorative justice practitioners and trained volunteers.

=== In criminal cases ===
In criminal cases, victims can testify about the crime's impact upon their lives, receive answers to questions about the incident, and participate in holding the offender accountable. Meanwhile, offenders can tell their story of why the crime occurred and how it has affected their lives. They are given an opportunity to compensate the victim directly – to the degree possible. In criminal cases, this can include money, community service in general and/or specific to the offense, education to prevent recidivism, and/or expression of remorse.

A courtroom process might employ pretrial diversion, dismissing charges after restitution. In serious cases, a sentence may precede other restitution.

In the community, concerned individuals meet with all parties to assess the experience and impact of the crime. Offenders listen to victims' experiences, preferably until they are able to empathize with the experience. Then they speak to their own experience: how they decided to commit the offense. A plan is made for prevention of future occurrences, and for the offender to address the damage to the injured parties. Community members hold the offender(s) accountable for adherence to the plan.

While restorative justice typically involves an encounter between the offender and the victim, some organizations, such as the Mennonite Central Committee Canada, emphasize a program's values over its participants. This can include programs that only serve victims (or offenders for that matter), but that have a restorative framework. Indigenous groups are using the restorative justice process to try to create more community support for victims and offenders, particularly the young people. For example, different programs are underway at Kahnawake, a Mohawk reserve in Canada, and at the Pine Ridge Indian Reservation of the Oglala Lakota nation, within the United States.

=== In prisons ===
Besides serving as an alternative to civil or criminal trial, restorative justice is also thought to be applicable to offenders who are currently incarcerated. The purpose of restorative justice in prisons is to assist with the prisoner's rehabilitation, and eventual reintegration into society. By repairing the harm to the relationships between offenders and victims, and offenders and the community that resulted from the crime, restorative justice seeks to understand and address the circumstances which contributed to the crime. This is thought to prevent recidivism (that is, that the offender repeats the undesirable behavior) once the offender is released.

Research of a restorative reentry planning circle process in Hawai‘i was shown to help children, whose incarcerated parents had one, address the trauma they suffered from losing a parent to prison.

The potential for restorative justice to reduce recidivism is one of the strongest and most promising arguments for its use in prisons. However, there are both theoretical and practical limitations, which can make restorative justice infeasible in a prison environment. However, restorative justice has been used in a prison setting in the state of Texas in 1998 through a program called The Sycamore Tree Project (STP). The first project took place inside a medium security prison in Sugarland, Texas. Sycamore Tree brought surrogate victims and offenders together to discuss the impact of crime on victims. Since 1998 the Sycamore Tree Project has been replicated around the world through Prison Fellowship International first starting in New Zealand and then in the UK and Australia.

Some cite difficulties working in prison to include: difficulty engaging offenders and victims to participate in mediation; the controversial influence of family, friends, and the community; and the prevalence of mental illness among prisoners.

=== In social work ===
In social work cases, impoverished victims such as foster children are given the opportunity to describe their future hopes and make concrete plans to transition out of state custody in a group process with their supporters. In social justice cases, restorative justice is used for problem solving.

=== In schools ===
Restorative justice has been implemented in some schools. It uses a model similar to programs used by the criminal-justice system. Restorative practices can "also include preventive measures designed to build skills and capacity in students as well as adults". Some examples of preventive measures in restorative practices include teachers and students devising classroom expectations together or setting up community-building in the classroom. Restorative justice also focuses on justice as needs and obligations, expands justice as conversations between the offender, victim and school, and recognizes accountability as understanding the impact of actions and repairing harm. In this approach, teachers, students and the community can reach agreements to meet all stakeholders needs. Collectivity is emphasized as the group must create an action-plan to heal harm and to find a way to bring the offender back into the community.

While focussing on making the victim(s) whole, restorative justice programs have the added benefit of reduction in disciplinary actions such as suspensions and expulsions resulting in lower discipline-numbers reported to the state, and more effective reformative and/or reconciliatory actions imposed, such as writing apology-letters, performing community service or – for example, in cases of bullying – composing a research paper on the negative effects of bullying.

== Methods ==
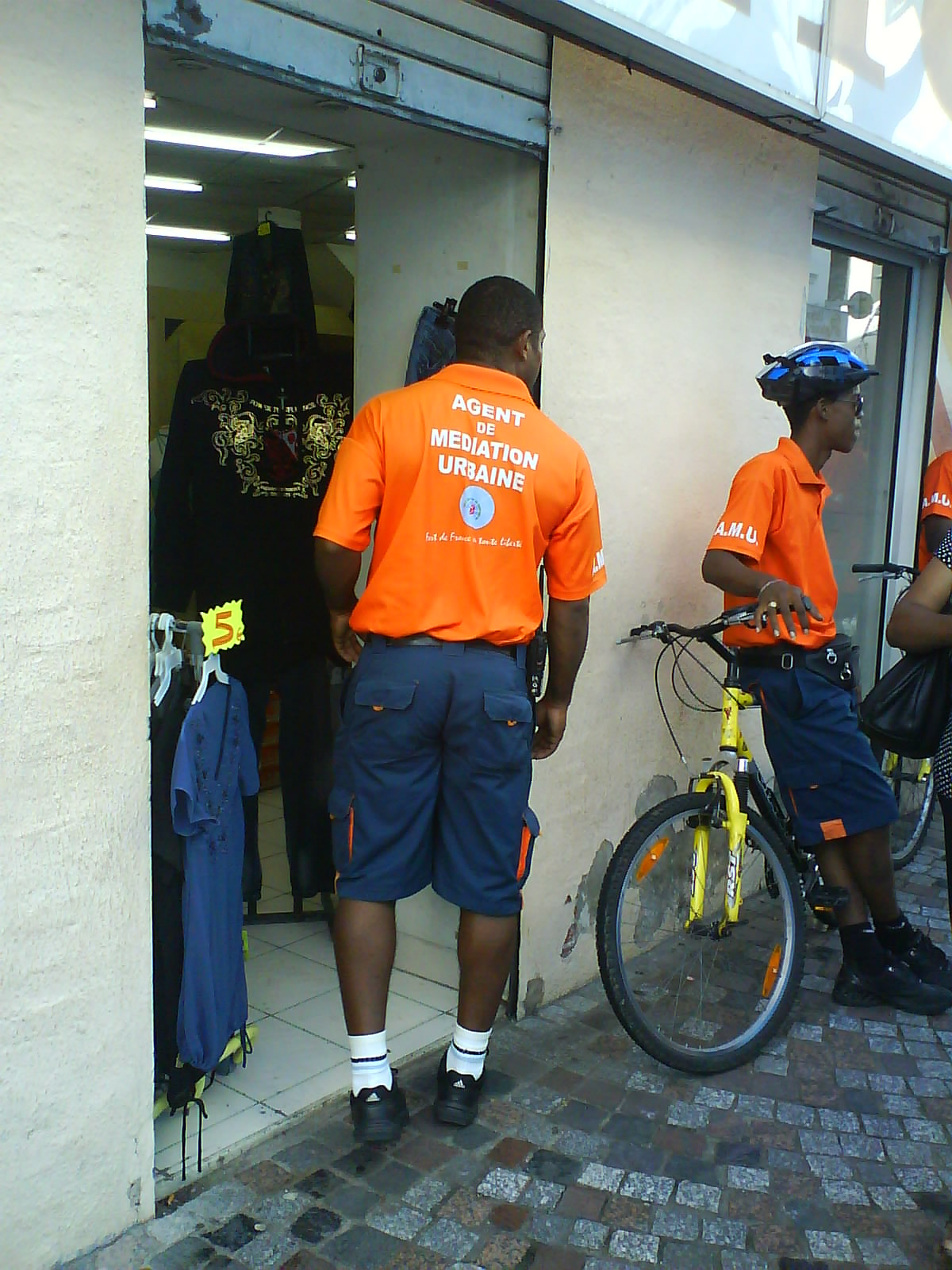
Urban mediation agent in Fort-de-France (Martinique)

Restorative justice recommends methods to hold perpetrators accountable while providing victims a voice, which includes a voluntary meeting between the offender and the victim. A 2013 Cochrane review restorative justice conferences where the offender meet the victim face-to-face, and explained that "[t]he victim is encouraged to attend but is under no obligation, and in some instances the victim may be represented by another party." However, alternatives to the practice exist, such as reading victim impact statements while holding the perpetrator accountable, reducing the risk of further harm or revictimization. In addition, the meeting may include people representing the wider community.

Suggested reasons for why it can be effective include:

- The offender has to learn about the harm they have caused to their victim, making it hard for them to justify their behavior.
- It offers a chance to discuss moral development to offenders who may have had little of it in their life.
- Offenders are more likely to view their punishment as legitimate.
- The programs tend to avoid shaming and stigmatizing the offender.

Many restorative justice systems, especially victim–offender mediation and family group conferencing, require participants to sign a confidentiality agreement. These agreements usually state that conference discussions will not be disclosed to nonparticipants. The rationale for confidentiality is that it promotes open and honest communication.

=== Victim-offender dialogue ===
Victim–offender dialogue (VOD), (also called victim–offender mediation, victim–offender conferencing, victim–offender reconciliation, or restorative justice dialogue), is usually a meeting, in the presence of one or two trained facilitators, between victim and offender. This system generally involves few participants, and often is the only option available to incarcerated offenders. Victim Offender Dialogue originated in Canada as part of an alternative court sanction in a 1974 Kitchener, Ontario case involving two accused vandals who met face-to-face with their many victims. One of the first victim–offender mediation projects in the United Kingdom was run by South Yorkshire Probation Service from 1983 to 1986.

On May 13, 2018 in Manhattan, video showed an 87-year old man using a Citibank ATM on Broadway. A 57-year old man walked up to him from behind and hit him on the back of the head. The victim died. The original proposal was to charge the attacker with felony murder, which had a maximum sentence of life in prison. Soon afterward, Assistant Manhattan District Attorney Dafna Yoran suggested using restorative justice to reduce the charge to manslaughter, which had a maximum sentence of 10 years, on two conditions. First, the suspect had to agree to participate in a 90 minute conversation with the family of the victim. Second, the family of the victim had to agree to the reduced charge. Both of these conditions were met, and the suspect was charged with manslaughter.

=== Family group conferencing ===
Family group conferencing (FGC) has a wider circle of participants than VOD, adding people connected to the primary parties, such as family, friends and professionals. FGC is most commonly used for juvenile cases, due to the important role of the family in a juvenile offender's life. Examples can be found in New South Wales, Australia, under the 1997 Young Offenders Act, and in New Zealand under the 1989 Children, Young Persons, and their Families Act. The New South Wales scheme has been favorably evaluated by the New South Wales Bureau of Crime Statistics and Research.

Fiji uses this form of mediation when dealing with cases of child sexual assault. While it may be seen as beneficial to involve the victim's family in the process, there are multiple issues stemming from this. For example, the vast majority of offenders are known to the victims in these cases. In a Fijian context, the notion of family extends wider than that of the normative Western idea. Therefore, involving the family in these cases may become complicated, for the family may not necessarily side with the victim or the process itself could cause rifts within the clan. Furthermore, the process as a whole places much emphasis on the victim forgiving the offender, as opposed to the offender making amends with the victim. Overall, the current process has the potential to cause great trauma and revictimise the victim.

=== Restorative conferences ===
Restorative conferences (RC) involves a wider circle of participants than VOD and FGC. There are many different names and procedures of operation for these community-based meetings. They are also referred to as Restorative Circles, Restorative Justice Conferences, Community Restorative Boards or Community Accountability Conferences. Specific programs have their own names, such as Community Justice Committees in Canada and Referral Order Panels in England & Wales. Restorative Circles refers to restorative justice conferences in Brazil and Hawaii, though can have a wider meaning in the field of restorative practices.

A conference will typically include the victim, the offender and members of the local community, who have typically received some training. The family and friends of the offender and victim are frequently invited. RC is explicitly victim-sensitive. The community members discuss the nature and impact of the offense with the offender. The discussion continues until restitution is agreed; they may also see that the agreement is fulfilled.

The largest restorative justice conference in history took place in the course of the 1990 reconciliation campaign that ended the blood feuds among ethnic Albanians in Kosovo, which was attended by between 100,000 and 500,000 participants. The reconciliation campaign was led by Anton Çetta, and over a period of three years (1990–1992) approximately one third of the entire population of Kosovo were documented to be actively involved in restorative justice conferences to end the blood feuds.

=== Circles of Support and Accountability ===
Circles of Support and Accountability (CoSA) originated as a project of the "Welcome In", a Mennonite church in Hamilton, Ontario. This approach has demonstrated the capacity to enhance the safe integration of otherwise high-risk sex offenders with their community. Canada judges some sex offenders too dangerous for any form of conditional release, "detaining" them until they serve their entire sentence. A subsequent conviction often leads to designation as a "Dangerous Offender".

Prior to 1994, many such offenders were released without any support or observation beyond police surveillance. Between 1994 and 2007, CoSA assisted with the integration of well over 120 such offenders. Research indicated that surrounding a 'core member' with 5–7 trained volunteer circle members reduced recidivism by nearly 80%. Further, recidivist offences were less invasive and less brutal than without the program. CoSA projects now exist in every Canadian province and every major urban centre. CoSA projects are also operational in several U.S. states (Iowa, California, Minnesota, Oregon, Ohio, Colorado, Vermont) as well as in several United Kingdom regions (Cornwall, Devon, Hampshire, Thames Valley, Leicestershire, North Wales, North Yorkshire, and Manchester).

=== Sentencing circles ===
Sentencing circles use traditional circle ritual and structure to involve all interested parties. The procedure commonly works as follows: the offender applies for the intervention, a healing circle is held for the victim, a healing circle is held for the offender, a sentencing circle is held and finally, follow-up circles to monitor progress.

== Other social movements ==
=== Positive criminology and positive victimology ===
Positive criminology and positive victimology are conceptual approaches, developed by the Israeli criminologist Natti Ronel and his research team, that are well connected to restorative justice theories and practice. Positive criminology and victimology both place an emphasis on social inclusion and on unifying and integrating forces at individual, group, social and spiritual levels that are associated with the limiting of crime and recovery from victimization. In traditional approaches the study of crime, violence and related behaviors emphasizes the negative aspects in people's lives that are associated with deviance, criminality and victimization. A common understanding is that human relationships are affected more by destructive encounters than by constructive or positive ones. Positive criminology and victimology argue that a different approach is viable, based on three dimensions – social integration, emotional healing and spirituality – that constitute positive direction indicators.

=== Prison abolition ===
Prison abolition not only calls for the eradication of cages, but also new perspectives and methodologies for conceptualizing crime, an aim that is shared by restorative justice. In an abolitionist style of restorative justice, participation is voluntary and not limited by the requirements of organizations or professionals, the process includes all relevant stakeholders and is mediated by an independent third party. The emphasis is on meeting the needs of and strengthening the community.

== Research ==
Studies on restorative justice generally report positive outcomes. However restorative justice studies are usually self-selecting, tempering the generalizability of positive results.

A 2007 meta-study of all research projects concerning restorative justice conferencing published in English between 1986 and 2005 found positive results, specifically for victims:

- Greater ability to return to work, to resume normal daily activities, and to sleep.
- No cases of offenders verbally or violently abusing victims.
- Reduced fear of the offender (especially for violence victims); lower perceived likelihood of another offense; increased sense of security; reduced anger towards the offender; greater sympathy for the offender and the offender's supporters; greater feelings of trust in others; increased feelings of self-confidence; reduced anxiety.

Other findings included:

- The only principled basis for selectively allowing, or banning, restorative justice is harm reduction.
- Limited public familiarity and misconceptions about restorative justice.
- Greater availability, together with information about victims' positive views is likely to increase the proportion of victims willing to participate.

However, in a 2002 meta-review of the literature focused on victim experiences, it was concluded there was no evidence that victims were more satisfied with restorative justice when compared with traditional justice.

While the principle of restorative justice makes victims central to the process, research has shown that, in practice, restorative justice programs often become offender-focused, minimizing the needs and experiences of victims. A 2002 study found that while the majority victims reported positive experiences with restorative justice, their level of satisfaction was lower than offenders'. Some victims report feeling the offender's apologies are disingenuous and/or that their experience and emotions are invalidated. In other studies, a minority victims have reported feeling pressured to forgive the offender, downplay the intensity of their emotions, or move quickly through the restorative justice process.

In July 2011, the International Center for Transitional Justice published a report entitled "To Live as Other Kenyans do: A Study of the Demands of Kenyan Victims of Human Rights Violations". The findings are based on individual and group interviews of victims of human rights abuses from Kenya's 2007 post-election violence. It highlights the importance of a victim-centered approach to determine the most effective mode of implementation for a comprehensive reparations program. The main finding of the report is that victims demand tangible basic benefits lost as a product of violence, such as food and shelter. It also acknowledges the need for symbolic reparations, such as formal apologies. The provision of reparations will in a sense create a restoration of the way life was before violence, and also signal the moving forward of a society through institutional change.

The COREPOL Project (Conflict Resolution, Mediation and Restorative Justice and the Policing of Ethnic Minorities in Germany, Austria and Hungary) has been researching the effects of restorative justice programs in Germany, Austria and Hungary. Its goal is to establish whether restorative justice can lead to better relations between the police and minority groups. Its first stage is to look at the extent and role of restorative justice programs within the countries. The second stage is to look at the position of certain minority populations within the societies, with the study focusing on Turks in Germany, Roma in Hungary and Africans in Austria. The involvement of the police in restorative justice programs for minority populations will be explored. Finally, the proposed research will give examples of when restorative justice can be used to improve communication and interaction between the police and minority groups. The study deals with countries that use the civil law legal system, in contrast to the common law legal system of English-speaking countries. COREPOL is coordinated by the German Police University and funded through the European Commission's Seventh Framework Program (FP7).

=== Stories and Case Studies ===
Stories of victims and offenders have been widely told through the work of Restorative Justice International founded in 2008 on social media. Through blog posts and podcasts victims, offenders, and exonerees tell their stories. The Justice & Reconciliation Project, founded in the late 1990s in California, focused its work on telling the stories of victims of violent crime who supported restorative justice. National Public Radio featured crime victim Cheryl Ward Kaiser and JRP President Lisa Rea on Talk of the Nation "Finding Closure Through Confrontation" in 2007. https://www.npr.org/2007/04/30/9918836/finding-closure-through-confrontation Sharon Daniel created an interactive documentary, Inside the Distance, (2013) that shares experiences from Belgian victims, offenders, and mediators. This project has been exhibited at the European Forum for Restorative Justice and the U.S. National Center on Restorative Justice.

=== Recidivism ===
Reduction of recidivism is also a goal of restorative justice, secondary to the restoration of offenders. Proponents argue that it can prevent reoffending and deter other potential criminals. Critics counter that restorative justice does not significantly influence crime rates.

While some older studies showed mixed results, as of 2013, studies that compared recidivism rates have become more definitive and in favor of restorative justice. Some studies claim modest, relative reductions, but more recent studies are finding significant and meaningful reductions in recidivism rates (see below).

A 1998 meta-analysis by Bonta et al. found that restorative justice programs caused mild reductions in reoffending rates. Latimer, Dowden and Muise carried out a meta-analysis that provided a more precise definition. conducted the second meta-analysis on the effectiveness of restorative justice. This study is important because it addresses the file-drawer problem. Also, some of the studies analyzed implemented a randomized controlled trial (a gold standard in research methods), although this does not represent the majority of studies included. This meta-analysis lends empirical support for the effectiveness of restorative justice to lower recidivism rates and increase compliance and satisfaction rates. However, the authors caution that a self-selection bias is rife through most studies of restorative justice. They reference authors from one study who found no evidence that restorative justice has a treatment effect on recidivism beyond a self-selection effect.

The third meta-analysis on the effectiveness of restorative justice was conducted by Bradshaw, Roseborough, and Umbreit in 2006. The results of this meta-analysis add empirical support for the effectiveness of restorative justice in reducing juvenile recidivism rates. Since then, studies by Baffour in (2006) and Rodriguez (2007) have also concluded that restorative justice reduces recidivism rates compared to the traditional justice system. Bergseth (2007) and Bouffard (2012) supported these findings and also concluded that there may be some long-term effects of restorative justice over the traditional justice system; as well as restorative justice being more effective with serious crimes, restorative justice participants are less likely to commit serious crimes if they do re-offend and they go longer without re-offending. All of these studies found that restorative justice is equally effective regardless of race.

In 2007, Lawrence W. Sherman and Heather Strang published a review of the previous literature and they conclude that in no way can restorative justice be more harmful than the traditional justice system. It is at least equally as effective as the traditional justice system in all cases. In most cases (especially with more serious offenses and with adult offenders) it is significantly more effective than the traditional justice system at lowering recidivism rates. It also reduced crime victims' post-traumatic stress symptoms and related costs and desires for violent revenge against their offenders. It provided both victims and offenders with more satisfaction with justice than the alternative, and saved money overall.

A 2013 meta-analysis by the Cochrane Collaboration on the effect of youth justice conferencing on recidivism in young offenders found that there was no significant effect for restorative justice conferencing over normal court procedures for number re-arrested, nor monthly rate of reoffending. They also noted a lack of high quality evidence regarding the effectiveness of restorative justice conferencing for young offenders.

A 2023 meta-analysis found that restorative justice programs were associated with significant and small reductions in general recidivism but not violent recidivism. In addition, restorative justice programs resulted in greater victim and client satisfaction, victims’ views of procedural justice, and client accountability compared to traditional legal system approaches. There were significant sample, study, and program moderators that influenced the effects of restorative justice in reducing recidivism outcomes.

== Criticism ==
Restorative justice has generally not shown improvements for recidivism rates in violent crimes.

According to Allison Morris, the following are some of the most common criticisms of restorative justice:

...restorative justice erodes legal rights; restorative justice results in net-widening; restorative justice trivializes crime (particularly men's violence against women); restorative justice fails to "restore" victims and offenders; restorative justice fails to effect real change and to prevent recidivism; restorative justice results in discriminatory outcomes; restorative justice extends police powers; restorative justice leaves power imbalances untouched; restorative justice leads to vigilantism; restorative justice lacks legitimacy; and restorative justice fails to provide "justice".

Another critique of restorative justice suggests that professionals are often left out of the restorative justice conversation. Albert W. Dzur and Susan M. Olson argue that this sector of justice cannot be successful without professionals. They claim that professionals can aid in avoiding problems that come up with informal justice and propose the theory of democratic professionalism, where professionals are not just agents of the state – as traditional understandings would suggest – but as mediums, promoting community involvement while still protecting individuals' rights.

Additionally, some critics like Gregory Shank and Paul Takagi see restorative justice as an incomplete model in that it fails to fix the fundamental, structural inequalities that make certain people more likely to be offenders than others. They and others question the structure of society and the fairness of institutional systems at their very core, pushing for addressing the root causes of many one-on-one offenses as well as for creating a socio-economic system that will be more conducive to harmonious, healthy living in general.

Some researchers agree that more research must be conducted to support the validity of restorative justice in schools, specifically in how it is implemented. More exactly, restorative justice practices that are inconsistent, insufficient, or run out of funding tend to have the worst reputations for success. While many research studies support positive findings in restorative justice, continuing studies are still needed.

Some judicial systems only recognize monetary restitution agreements. For instance, if the victim and offender agree that the offender would pay $100 and mow the victim's lawn five times, the court would only recognize the $100 as restitution. Some agreements specify a larger monetary amount (e.g., $200) to be paid if the non-monetary restitution is not completed. Many jurisdictions cap the amount which a juvenile offender can be required to pay. Labor regulations typically limit the personal service tasks that can be performed by minors. In addition, personal service usually must be approved by the juvenile's parents. According to the Victim Offender Mediation Association, victims are not allowed to profit from restitution or punitive damages; only out-of-pocket losses (actual damages) can be recovered. Courts can disallow unreasonable compensation arrangements.

Both victim and offender can be hesitant to engage in victim–offender dialogue later in the criminal justice process. Once an offender starts serving a sentence, they may believe that the sentence is how they take responsibility for their actions rather than conversing with the victim. For victims, the trial and the sentencing of the offender may terminate the possibilities for discussion. For both offender and victim, victim–offender dialogue is limited in the amount of trust between the two parties.

== In the media ==
Studies by Kelly M. Richards have shown that the general public would be open to the idea of alternative forms of justice, though only after the idea has been explicitly explained to them. According to other studies performed by Vicky De Mesmaecker, in order for restorative justice to become publicly accepted, there must be an effective public relations collaboration between the media and the criminologists.

The use of forgiveness as a tool has in the restorative justice programs, run for victims and perpetrators of the Rwandan genocide, the violence in Israeli–Palestinian conflict, and Northern Ireland conflict, has also been documented in film, Beyond Right and Wrong: Stories of Justice and Forgiveness (2012). A tribal form of restorative justice is portrayed in the book Touching Spirit Bear by Ben Mikaelsen.

The 2004 British drama film Red Dust based on the novel by the same name tells an exemplary fictional story about the applied methodology of restorative justice used by the Truth and Reconciliation Commission (South Africa).

The 2017 Canadian documentary A Better Man follows a meeting between a woman who is recovering from domestic violence and the ex-partner.

Season 2 episode 5 of the NPR podcast Mindshift compares two schools that use restorative discipline practices, one that has already made the transition and one that is just beginning to use these practices. Peace Alliance hosts a twice weekly discussion forum on restorative justice called Restorative Justice on the Rise. There is public discussion about the restorative justice movement, as well as an archive of past discussions since January 27, 2019.

In July 2020 the BBC Radio 4 series The Punch examined the case of Jacob Dunne who was convicted of manslaughter after landing one blow on his victim, James Hodgkinson, in a fight outside a pub. Hodgkinson did not recover and died nine days later. The programme told of the meeting between Dunne and Hodgkinson's parents and considered the impact on both parties.

== See also ==
- Bullying
- Civil Rights and Restorative Justice Project
- Community Resolutions
- Conflict resolution
- Distributive justice
- Hoʻoponopono
- International Institute for Restorative Practices
- Instrumental theories of justice
- Reparations (transitional justice)
- Right to an effective remedy
- Sentencing disparity
- Therapeutic jurisprudence
- Transformative justice
- Transitional justice
- Victimology
- Victims' rights
- Youth intervention
