= Sans domicile fixe =

Sans domicile fixe (French for 'homeless person') may refer to:

- "Sans domicile fixe", a 1990 song by the band Bratsch
- "Sans domicile fixe", a 1996 song by Raphaël Faÿs
