= Kidpower =

International nonprofit organization

Kidpower Teenpower Fullpower International
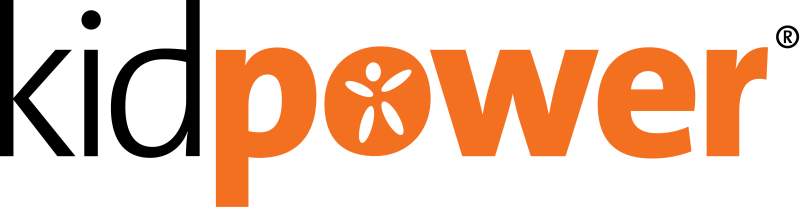
- Abbreviation: Kidpower
- Founded: 1989
- Type: Nonprofit
- Purpose: Child safety, self-defense
- Headquarters: Santa Cruz, California
- Location: 20+ locations throughout the world
- Region served: United States & International
- Services: Child Protection, Bullying and Abuse Prevention, and Stranger Safety Workshops; Books; Curriculum; Safety Consultations; and Online Resources
- Executive Director/Founder: Irene van der Zande
- Website: kidpower.org

Kidpower Teenpower Fullpower International, commonly shortened to Kidpower, is a 501(c)(3) nonprofit child safety organization teaching child protection and personal safety skills to adults and children to prevent bullying, abuse, abduction, and other violence. Kidpower was founded in 1989 in Santa Cruz, California, and has ten locations in the U.S. and 20 in other countries.

Kidpower has provided services to millions of people worldwide of all ages, and abilities, including people with special needs. In addition to stranger safety (awareness and abduction prevention), confidence skills, boundary setting skills, positive peer communication (bullying prevention), and de-escalation skills to stop a fight before it gets physical, Kidpower also teaches physical self-defense to adults, teens, and children as young as six years old, using padded instructors.

In September 2014, Kidpower launched an initiative to establish September as International Child Protection Month, with the goal to create a global annual event that supports adult leadership in protecting young people from harm, and empowering them with skills to take charge of their own well-being, a core element of Kidpower's programs. Kidpower's One Million Safer Kids campaign, launched in 2011, aims to broaden its reach to provide safety and confidence building lessons to one million more young people by July 2016.

Kidpower workshops are most frequently taught in schools and for community or service groups, such as Police Department Service Clubs, Girl Scouts, and agencies that provide services to at-risk youth and adults, such as domestic violence shelters, homeless shelters, and migrant education agencies.

Kidpower programs are known for being positive, practical, safe, and age-appropriate. Kidpower has coined a new term to describe the skills taught in its programs, "People Safety", defined as people being emotionally and physically safe, both with themselves and others.

== History ==
Kidpower was founded by Irene van der Zande in 1989, spurred by an incident where she defended herself and a group of young children from a man threatening to kidnap one of the children. She stood between the man and the children, and he ran away after she yelled at him to gain the attention of others at the scene, asking them to join her in protecting the children.

Kidpower has grown from a local California nonprofit to an International organization that trains and supports nonprofit centers, with more than 150 certified instructors across 16 countries, teaching people of all ages practical personal safety skills to prevent most forms of violence, including bullying, abduction, and molestation.

Kidpower of Colorado, based in Colorado Springs, is the largest of the U.S. local nonprofit Kidpower centers outside of California. It has trained more than 38,000 people in its 20 years in Southern Colorado. The Colorado center was founded in 1994 by current executive director Jan Isaacs Henry, a psychotherapist from 1979 to 1995 who, upon taking the Kidpower Instructor Training, decided to found and build a center in Colorado.

== Locations ==
Most US Kidpower centers operate under the umbrella organization's 501(c)(3) tax exempt status, with Tax IDs that are part of a subset of the overall International organization's IRS listing. Kidpower of Colorado is the exception, having grown large enough to qualify for its own Tax ID. Kidpower centers in countries outside of the U.S. all have nonprofit status in their respective countries.

In addition to training instructors and supporting the creation of centers, Kidpower has trained professionals in more than 30 countries altogether to bring Kidpower curriculum and skills training to their local communities. For example, Kidpower has provided training about teaching child safety to parents and teachers in Africa.

Kidpower Locations

U.S. Locations

- California (Headquarters; eight offices, serving Northern and Southern California)
- Colorado (Kidpower of Colorado; Colorado Springs)
- Chicago I
- D.C.
- Maryland (Chesapeake and Potomac Kidpower)
- North Carolina (Kidpower North Carolina; Chapel Hill)
- Pennsylvania
- Vermont (Kidpower Vermont)
- Texas (Kidpower Austin)

Locations outside the U.S.

- Argentina
- Australia
- Bangladesh
- Canada – Montreal
- Canada – Vancouver
- Cuba
- Ecuador
- France
- Germany
- Guatemala
- India
- Lebanon
- Mexico
- Nepal
- Netherlands
- New Zealand
- Persia
- South Africa
- Sweden
- United Kingdom
- Vietnam

== Program research ==
The Kidpower program is based on research that shows people who practice skills are more likely to use them effectively in an uncomfortable or threatening situation. Kidpower programs have been studied independently as well as undergoing frequent review to ensure that they align with evidence-based prevention and positive child/youth development best practices. In addition to regular participant evaluations, Kidpower programs have undergone multiple formal research studies and evaluations by independent evaluation professionals in the US, Canada, and New Zealand.

- 2014 "Empowering children with safety-skills: An evaluation of the Kidpower Everyday Safety-Skills Program", published in Children and Youth Services Review, Volume 44, September 2014, Pages 152–162 with full public access as long as the study title, journal, and authors are cited. Assistant Professor Alaina Brenick, Phd, of the University of Connecticut, Julie Shattuck of Shattuck Applied Research and Evaluation, Alice Donlanc, Shinchieh Duhd, Professor Eileen L. Zurbriggen, Phd, of the University of California, Santa Cruz.

The article includes a thorough literature review demonstrating how the Kidpower program "uses best practices in victimization risk-reduction and prevention" and an independent analysis of the findings of "The Effects of the Kidpower Everyday Safety Skills on Third Grade Children" demonstrating the effectiveness of the Kidpower program in teaching safety skills to children.

- 2013 "Promoting Safety Skills in Children: A Quasi-experimental Evaluation of the Kidpower Everyday Safety Skills Program". Brenick, A., Shattuck, J., Donlan, A., Duh, S., & Zubriggen, E. (2013, April). Poster presented at the biennial meeting of the Society for Research in Child Development, Seattle, Washington, on April 18, 2013.

In 2013, an independent study was presented at the Society for Research in Child Development's Biennial Meeting, which shows that Kidpower's Every Day Skills Program "significantly increases children's safety skills knowledge" and that 31% of Kidpower students showed improved safety skills and knowledge over three months, compared with a comparison group of children who had not taken Kidpower yet.

- 2010 Ruddie Memorial Youth Foundation-funded Shattuck Applied Research and Evaluation Study documenting the effectiveness of the Kidpower Everyday Safety Program in Santa Cruz, California.
- 2006 Colorado Trust-funded JVA Study documenting positive skill outcomes of the Personal Safety Project for special education students in Colorado Springs, Colorado.
- 2006 Quebec study by Sylviane Raymond documenting positive modification of children's behavior over time in the Kidpower Day Care Project.
- 2005 Todd Foundation-funded study of New Zealand Kidpower school program, documenting the learning and use of safety skills and increased confidence of children, ages 8–12.
- 2004 Lucile Packard Foundation for Children's Health-funded study by LaFrance Associates documenting reports from parents and teachers of 550 Head Start children of the effectiveness of the Kidpower Program.
- 2002 doctoral dissertation by Kim Leisey, Ph.D. of early adolescent girls who described how self-protection training of the kind provided by Kidpower helped them feel safe.

== Nonprofit partnerships ==
In 2011, Kidpower began a partnership with U.S. national nonprofit, Positive Coaching Alliance (PCA) to provide trainings to prevent child sex abuse specifically for youth sports organizations, coaches and parents. In 2013, Kidpower founder and executive director, Irene van der Zande was asked to join the PCA's National Advisory Board. PCA has joined Kidpower as a founding partner to promote International Child Protection Month in September 2014.

In 2012, Kidpower began working with Tenderloin Safe Passage in San Francisco to provide personal safety workshops to the organizations' staff and volunteers who patrol a "safe passage" for children walking through the Tenderloin neighborhood. In 2013, TSP sponsored several Kidpower "handling street harassment" community workshops.

== Publications ==
Irene van der Zande is the primary author of Kidpower curriculum, articles and books. Books include:

- The Kidpower Book for Caring Adults: Personal Safety, Self-Protection, Confidence, and Advocacy for Young People, (2012) with foreword by Gavin de Becker.
- "The Kidpower Safety Comics Series", includes editions for parents with young children ages 3–8, older children ages 9–13, and "Fullpower Safety Comics" for teens and adults. English, Spanish and bilingual editions for families and teachers.
- Bullying: What Adults Need To Know And Do To Keep Kids Safe (2010)
- In Chapter 3 of Courageous Parents, Confident Kids, by Amy Tiemann (2010) is an essay: "Kidpower: Skills for Safety, Skills for Independence" by Irene van der Zande.
