= Transitional housing =

Temporary housing for certain homeless people

Transitional housing is temporary housing for certain segments of the homeless population, including working homeless people who are earning too little money to afford long-term housing. Transitional housing is set up to transition residents into permanent, affordable housing. It is not in an emergency homeless shelter, but usually a room or apartment in a residence with support services.

== Description ==
The transitional time can be short, for example one or two years, and in that time the person must file for and get permanent housing and usually some gainful employment or income, even if Social Security or assistance. The cost of transitional housing is the same or less expensive than emergency shelters. But, due to the on site services, transitional tends to be more expensive than permanent supportive housing. In the USA, federal funding for transitional housing programs was originally allocated in the McKinney–Vento Homeless Assistance Act of 1986. In 2022, the Transitional Housing Program, awarded 72 recipients, spending over $35.6 million in the program. In Hong Kong, as part of the Chief Executive of Hong Kong’s policy address in 2018, a Task Force on Transitional Housing was set up under the then Transport and Housing Bureau to actively assist and facilitate various short-term initiatives proposed and implemented by the community to increase the supply of transitional housing.

An example of Transitional Housing designed specifically for youth is the Foyer model. Providers generally provide a combination of affordable accommodation with vocational, work, and counseling opportunities.

== See also ==
- Boarding house – residence that provides meals and a room to live in, with some communal areas
- Rooming house – residence that provides a room to live in, but not meals
- Single room occupancy – residence that rents rooms to individuals
- Youth intervention
