= International Institute for Restorative Practices =

Social science field

Coordinates: 40.62132°N 75.38199°W

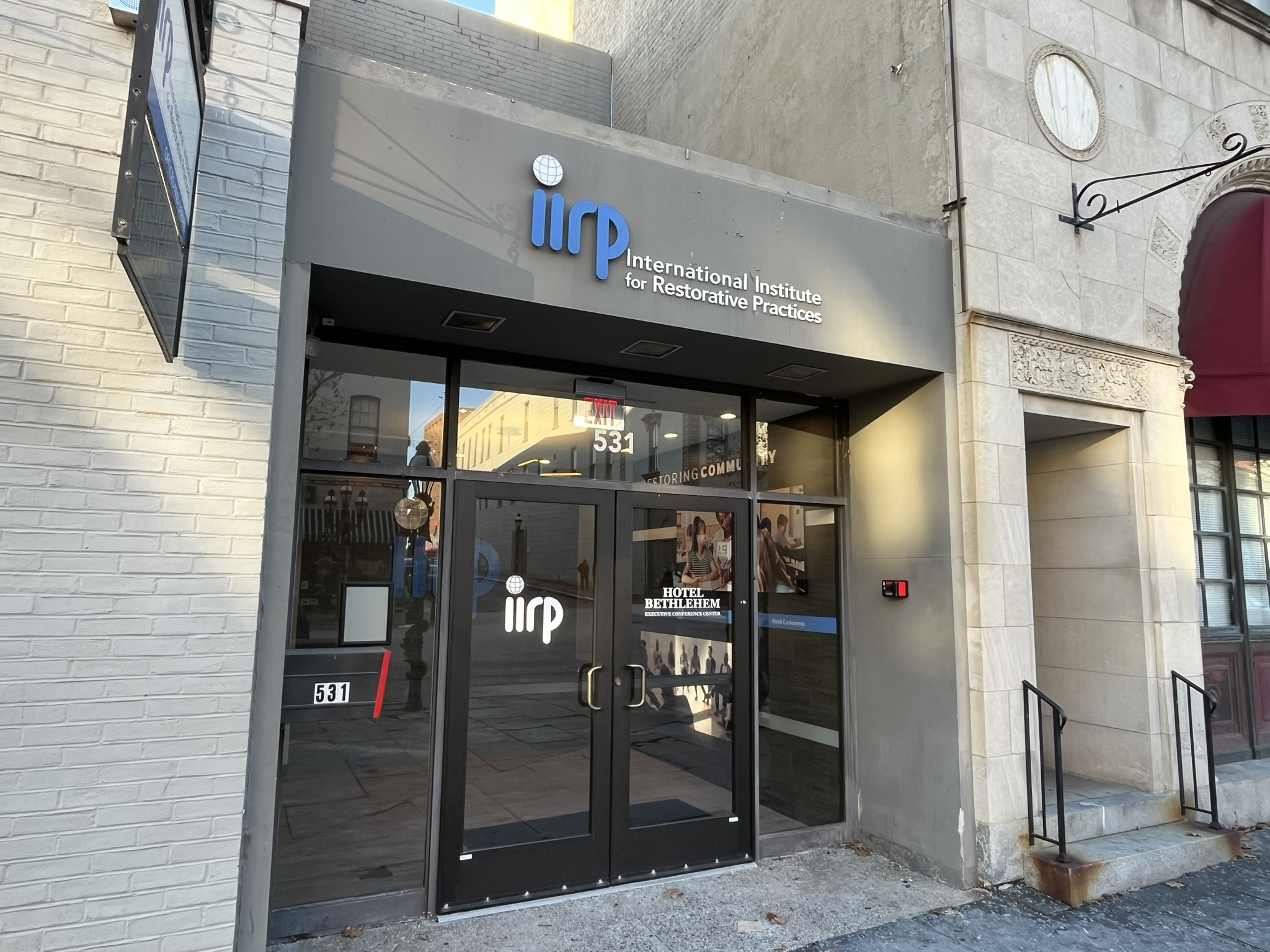
- International Institute for Restorative Practices on Main Street in Bethlehem, Pennsylvania
- Type: Private university
- Established: 1977
- Accreditation: Middle States Commission on Higher Education
- President: Linda J. Kligman
- Students: 383
- Location: Bethlehem, Pennsylvania, United States

The International Institute for Restorative Practices Graduate School (IIRP) is a private graduate school located in Bethlehem, Pennsylvania. It is the world's first accredited graduate school specializing exclusively in the study, research, and teaching of restorative practices. The institution's mission is to strengthen relationships, support communities, influence social change, and broaden the field of restorative practices.

== Academics ==
The IIRP offers a Master of Science in Restorative Practices. The 30-credit degree program includes optional specializations in Community Engagement and Education, as well as a Thesis Option for students interested in conducting original research.

Additionally, the graduate school offers 12-credit Graduate Certificates in:

- Restorative Practices.
- Relational Facilitation for Healing Trauma.
- Change Implementation in Organizations and Social Systems.

Courses are delivered across three academic terms through online, blended, and individualized independent study modalities.

== Campus and Accreditation ==
The IIRP campus, administrative offices, and library are situated in the historic district of downtown Bethlehem, Pennsylvania. The institution is regionally accredited by the Middle States Commission on Higher Education (MSCHE), with its accreditation most recently reaffirmed in 2025.
