= Youth services =

Community support activity

Youth services is a field of practices within the social services sector in North America. Defined as "programs, activities, and services aimed at providing a range of opportunities for school-aged children, including mentoring, recreation, education, training, community service, or supervision in a safe environment," youth services are a comprehensive series of strategies, activities, programs and organizations spread across the United States and Canada today. In North America, youth services are generally viewed as more organized and systemized than youth work. The term "youth services" is used in international contexts as well.

== Activities ==
Youth services are varied and disparate, often emerging from the needs of their local context or from the mandate of external funding sources. "Best practices in youth services include the provision of safety, appropriate supervision, supportive relationships, opportunities to belong, positive social norms, support for efficacy and skill building, and integration of community, school, and family efforts."

Specific activities, projects, programs and organizations within the realm of youth services address a variety of issues. According to Fletcher (2024), they include:

- Prevention
- Intervention
- Out-of-school time education
- Personal identities
- Civics and democracy
- Culture and society
- Rights and freedoms
- Youth-specific issues
- Public health
- Personal health (including mental health)
- The economy
- Crisis support
- Nature and the outdoors
- Recreation
- The arts
- Personal development
- Empowerment

Within each of those categories are more specific practices. For instance, the practice of "youth services librarianship" "encompasses all library services to youth (children and young adults, ages zero to eighteen) in school and public library settings." According to one author, it "has long been considered the classic success story of American libraries."

== Funding and support ==
There are various sources of funding for youth services across North America. They include government and philanthropic foundations, as well as corporate and private donors. In the U.S., the current thrust of youth services emphasizes positive youth development. In Contra Costa County, youth services "receives funding from the California Department of Education, the Contra Costa County Workforce Development Board, Contra Costa County Employment and Human Services, the Department of Rehabilitation, as well as other funding sources."

In addition to local variations, there has been a wide variety of political, fiscal and public support for youth services throughout time. For instance, the New York City Youth Board existed from 1947 until 1976 "when most of the program services were redistributed to several other city agencies." From that dispersion, many activities, projects and services were defunded and forgotten about for several years.

=== U.S. federal support ===
The U.S. federal government supports a variety of youth services. For instance, the United States Department of Labor houses the Employment and Training Administration Division of Youth Services. This division "primarily serve[s] young adults ages 16-24 that face a variety of barriers to employment. We provide leadership to the workforce system and our grantees, policy direction and guidance, support for program administration, and technical assistance." Some of their youth services programs include Workforce Innovation and Opportunity Act Youth Formula, YouthBuild, and Reentry Employment Opportunities.

The United States Department of Health & Human Services Office of the Administration for Children & Families extensively addresses youth services. Many issues are served by this agency, including:

- Adolescent pregnancy prevention: These services "educate adolescents on both abstinence and contraception for the prevention of pregnancy and sexually transmitted infections... and exclusively implement[s] sexual risk avoidance education that teaches youth how to voluntarily refrain from non-marital sexual activity, empower youth to make healthy decisions, and provide tools and resources to prevent youth engagement in other risky behaviors."
- Runaway and homeless youth: These programs "serve and protect runaway and homeless youth" through street outreach, transitional living skills education, and maternity group homes" for youth.
- Foster care and successful transitions to adulthood: The agency "provides funding to support youth and young adults in or formerly in foster care in their transition to adulthood."
- Unaccompanied refugee minors programs: "Services provided include arranging foster care, group homes, independent living situations, or reunification with relatives in the U.S., as well as other child welfare services to promote their well-being." The agency also researches and evaluates each of these program areas.

=== U.S. state support ===
Similarly, many U.S. states, counties and local municipalities support youth services as well. In Utah, the Department of Health and Human Services houses a division called juvenile justice and youth services whose goal is to "prevent delinquent behaviors through positive youth and family development." The stated goals of this division include, "Keep[ing] youth safely in their homes, schools and communities; Early screening of a youth and family strength and needs; Connect youth and families to appropriate services in the community." In Massachusetts, the Massachusetts Department of Youth Services is the "Juvenile Justice agency for the Commonwealth of Massachusetts" and "promotes positive change in the youth in our care and custody." In Illinois, the Department of Human Services Office of Community and Positive Youth Development offers youth services for "youth who are in trouble with the legal system" and "runaways/lock-outs/homeless youth," as well as for youth employment, teen pregnancy prevention, substance abuse prevention, community initiatives, and other areas.

=== U.S. county support ===
In Yamhill County, Oregon, the county government has a youth services division that focuses on children and youths' mental health, with their website stating they provide "an array of mental health professionals who have advanced education and training in counseling and various specialties. Our approach matches the best practices developed by research and national experts. We focus on helping children, teens and parents improve skills, health and well-being." Youth services offered by Contra Costa County, California are offered by the county's Office of Education and include "provides a broad range of coordinated services for youth who are in foster care, experiencing homelessness or other barriers and need support to finish school, find a job or pursue a career path." The Baltimore County, Maryland government "Youth Services Unit provides support for programs that engage eligible young people between the ages of 14 and 24 who are in school, have graduated or dropped out of high school, by providing valuable education, training, counseling and work-based learning opportunities."

== History of the field ==
Having started in the 1860s, the Commonwealth of Massachusetts counts their youth services as the "first in the nation." A comprehensive timeline from the University of North Carolina shows that library youth services began in the 17th century.

== Criticism ==
Critical perspectives of youth services are as broad as the number of practices throughout the field. For instance, Anthony Bernier, a professor at San Jose State University, wrote "The overarching assessment of youth services rendered by Leslie Edmonds in 1987 remains largely true today: that its most influential force remains not research, or evidence, or constant professional improvement or addressing field-based challenges, but 'superstition.'"

There are also concerns about continuity of care in youth services, "aging out" (the process of becoming an adult), the effects of austerity of the field, among others.

== See also ==
- Family and Youth Services Bureau
- Children and Youth Services Review
- List of youth organizations
- Sequel Youth and Family Services
- National Council for Voluntary Youth Services
- Ohio Department of Youth Services
- Youth intervention
