= Youth intervention =

Youth intervention is a practice within the field of youth services. This practice is designed to intervene when young people are at risk of or beginning to make poor decisions that can have lifelong negative impacts. Youth intervention is intended to support academic achievement and prevent juvenile delinquency.

== Basis ==
Youth intervention providers work with young people to help them become engaged and contributing members of the community. Typically, youth intervention programs work with young people between 6 and 18 years of age, but may also work with young people between 18 and 24 years of age.

Poor decision-making or engaging in negative behaviors that can lead to interaction with the juvenile justice system can often be a symptom of an underlying problem. Causation factors can include unaddressed mental and emotional health struggles, unhealthy family environments and relationships, as well as stress and adverse childhood experiences (ACES) related to poverty.

With the wide variety of challenges that can lead to poor decision-making, youth intervention encompasses a broad array of program approaches. Youth intervention can include:

- Pre-court diversion
- Restorative justice
- mental and chemical health counseling
- Mentoring
- Out-of-school time programs
- Transitional housing for young people who are homeless
- Employability

The theory of positive youth development underpins most youth intervention programs. Adults working in Youth Intervention programs are part of that needed web of support.

== Outcomes ==
With a focus on prevention, measuring the impact of youth intervention is challenging. It is difficult to document that behavior did not occur as a result of youth intervention programs. However, research has shown these programs are effective in reducing truancy and improving school performance. They also result in reduced court costs, a reduced need for social services by the youth and/or family and improved health outcomes. Youth intervention produces positive outcomes at a much lower price than incarceration in a juvenile correction facility. Studies show that 70% to 80% of youth who are incarcerated are likely to re-offend.

Both the National Research Council and the Institute of Medicine agree that the benefits of youth intervention programs outweigh the costs of prevention and early intervention programs. The estimated cost per youth for Youth Intervention is $1,000 to $5,000 per year depending on the type of service. The study also estimated that quality Youth Intervention programs result in $4.80 of benefits per dollar spent on the program.

== Structures for youth intervention ==
In the United States, youth intervention activities are provided on the local, regional, state and federal levels by public agencies and private organizations. They are fiscally supported through government funding, philanthropic grants, and private grants.

At the level of the U.S. federal government, "The Office of Juvenile Justice and Delinquency Prevention (OJJDP) sponsors research, programs and training initiatives in an effort to strengthen the juvenile justice system and serve at risk youth and their families.

One instance of a government agency supporting youth intervention comes from the State of Oregon, which has a program called the Oregon Youth Development Division. The division "also supports the YDC Youth Prevention/Intervention Committee," which focuses on intervening in drug use, alcohol use, underage sex and other activities.

Advocates for Youth is a private national nonprofit organization committed to youth intervention programming focused on pregnancy prevention and other issues. The once-popular Drug Abuse Resistance Education (D.A.R.E.) program and The Center to Prevent Youth Violence are two now-closed organizations that were also intervention-oriented, the former on drug abuse and the latter on youth violence. Similarly, the Massachusetts Tobacco Cessation and Prevention Program is oriented towards ending tobacco abuse.

The membership of the Youth Intervention Programs Association (YIPA) reflects the diverse approaches used in Youth Intervention.

== See also ==
- Youth programs
- Community youth development
