= Sport for social development =

Method of bringing social change through the use of sport

Sport for social development is a method of bringing about social change or supporting sustainable development through the intentional use of sports or physical activity. In the United States this is commonly referred to as sports-based youth development. Sport refers to the physical activity and development in any individual, health, social and economic benefits. Sport is used as a tool for peace and development. The programs use sport to help children learn lifelong skills as an incentive for the children to improve their scholarship. Sport is used as a tool to reach personal and community goals. Most organizations utilizing this method are geared towards underprivileged youth in urban areas or involve NGOs delivering sport-based programming in developing countries mostly located in the Global South.

The field of sport for development has also become increasingly formalised. There is now a body of professional qualifications supporting the field, as well as numerous active academic institutions and scholars.

== Promote youth development ==
Since the advent of modern Olympics in 1896, athletes have shown that sports enable people to come together in an effort to bring about global peace and to share a desire for self-improvement. Non-profit sports programs aiming to educate through similar means are part of an up-and-coming movement. However, through sport, children learn sportsmanship and other life skills. Youth sport can help them grow towards positive development and good relationships with others. Sport is a tool utilized to get young people involved in their communities. Positive peer group relationships are also encouraged through coaching as well as the physical activity, which makes sport particularly beneficial to children with disorders such as ADHD. This leads to youth feeling integrated with other young people. Through being involved in sports youth can gain self-esteem when they are enjoying the experience of taking part in a sport. Sports help them gain lifelong skills and want to do better in the classroom as well. Involvement in sports have been related to one having better cognitive functioning as well as higher grades and test scores, satisfaction in school, engagement in school, aspirations for college, and lower dropout rates. Also, according to the Official Website of the Olympic Movement, being surrounded by a supportive group of people with similar goals, as in playing a sport, "can alleviate the negative effects of poverty." Non-profit organizations are founded in urban areas affected by poverty to help marginalized children by creating an environment to unite people across gender, race, religion, or socioeconomic background.

== Impact on youth development ==
Sports programs help young people develop important skills like teamwork, leadership, and communication. Groups like Right to Play and the United Nations Office on Sport for Development and Peace (UNOSDP) use sports to teach kids about health, staying in school, and gender equality. These programs support education and help build stronger communities.

== Challenges and criticisms ==
While sports programs have positive goals, some say their results are hard to measure. Critics like Fred Coalter argue that these programs often share stories of success but lack solid data. Funding is another issue—many programs depend on outside money, making them hard to keep running. Furthermore, many have expressed concerns about the influence of funders on programming, as funders are viewed as pursuing their own interests and pushing neoliberal or capitalistic ideologies.
