= SquashBusters =

American youth development organization

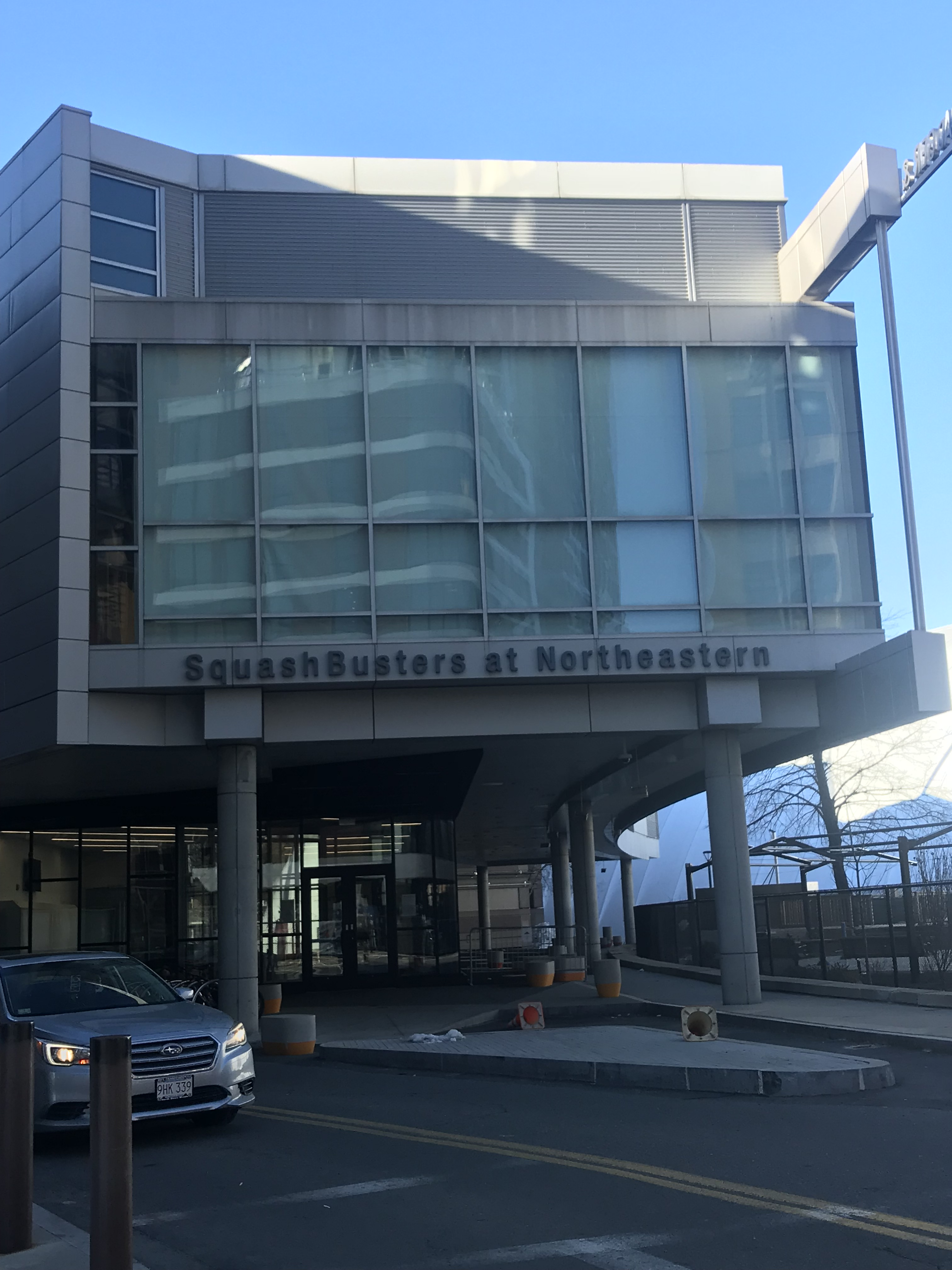
- Badgers & Rosen SquashBusters Facility at Northeastern University
- Formation: 1996
- Founder: Greg Zaff
- Type: Sports-based youth development organization
- Purpose: Youth development in squash and academics
- Headquarters: Boston, Massachusetts
- Region served: New England
- Affiliations: National Urban Squash and Education Association
- Website: squashbusters.org

SquashBusters is an American youth development organization that provides middle and high school students with academic tutoring and squash instruction. SquashBusters has served over 800 New England–based students since its founding in 1996. The organization, established by former squash professional Greg Zaff, is the oldest urban squash program in America. SquashBusters is a founding member of the National Urban Squash and Education Association, which currently includes 20 urban squash programs across the country.

== History ==
=== Founding ===
Greg Zaff, formerly the second-ranked squash player in the world, devised the concept of SquashBusters while enrolled at the Harvard John F. Kennedy School of Government. As a student in a social entrepreneurship class, he wrote "Bringing Squash Down from the Ivory Tower," a paper focused on broadening the appeal of the sport through the creation of an urban squash program. A few years later, in the mid-1990s, he quit his job at the Government of Massachusetts to focus on developing what would ultimately become SquashBusters. Zaff liaised with local politicians and institutions to secure support -- Harvard University agreed to lend the program court space, and then-Massachusetts Governor Bill Weld joined the board of directors.

The program officially began in 1996, when Zaff picked up 24 students from Boston middle schools and took them to local squash courts at the Boston YMCA and the Harvard Club of Boston. Programming ran for three days a week, with an hour and a half of homework help and an hour and a half of squash practice. Based on the impact of the program, Zaff wanted to expand SquashBusters to continue serving students through high school. However, there were not enough available courts in Boston to sustain middle and high school programming. Zaff began to search for a permanent location to establish SquashBusters.

=== Partnership with Northeastern ===
In the early 2000s, SquashBusters officially partnered with Northeastern University to build a permanent facility. Then-Northeastern President Richard M. Freeland had played squash through college and was supportive of SquashBusters' mission and vision. Freeland and Zaff agreed that Northeastern would provide the land free of charge if Squashbusters raised $6 million to cover the cost of building the facility. Following a successful round of fundraising, the Badgers & Rosen SquashBusters Facility officially opened in 2003. SquashBusters must raise an additional $2 million each year to cover operational costs, for which they host a number of annual charity squash tournaments, including the MFS SquashBusters Derby.

== Programming ==
=== Squash ===
Founded on the sports-based youth development program model, SquashBusters provides students with three to five hours of squash practice per week. Squash instruction is provided by volunteers, staff coaches, and former professionals, including world champions Thierry Lincou and Amanda Sobhy. SquashBusters students play in matches against local high school squash teams, tournaments with other urban squash programs, and regional and national junior-level championships. Since 2018, 31 SquashBusters alumni have gone on to play collegiate squash for universities such as Colby College and Harvard University.

=== College Preparation ===
The ultimate aim of the SquashBusters program is for every student to enroll in, and eventually graduate from, college. As early as middle school, students visit college information sessions. When participants enter high school, SquashBusters offers standardized test preparation, essay workshops, and one-on-one mentorship throughout the college application process. Additionally, they provide financial aid counseling and scholarship opportunities for collegiate alumni. Ninety percent of SquashBusters graduates enroll in college, nearly thirty percent higher than the Boston Public Schools average.

== Regional Expansion ==
=== Lawrence ===
In 2012, Dora Lubin, a former employee at CitySquash, an urban squash program in the Bronx, opened a SquashBusters affiliate in Lawrence, Massachusetts. SquashBusters Lawrence operates in a brand new, New Balance facility opened in 2024 in Lawrence. The program serves 87 students, over half of whom speak English as a second language.

=== Providence ===
In 2018, SquashBusters expanded to a third location in Providence, Rhode Island. Squash instruction is led by Rodney Galvao, a graduate of SquashBusters Boston and former member of the Bates College squash team. The program operates out of the newly built Gorgi Family Squash and Education Center at the Moses Brown School.

=== National Affiliation ===
In 2005, Zaff joined forces with directors of urban squash programs in the Bronx and Philadelphia to establish the National Urban Squash and Education Association. Now called the Squash and Education Alliance (SEA), the organization aims to support and connect urban squash programs in twenty-two cities across America and five locations globally. As a founding member, SquashBusters is highly active in the SEA community. SquashBusters students participate in SEA events like the annual Urban Squash Citizenship Tour, where they met with then-Massachusetts Governor Deval Patrick in 2014.

== See also ==
- Amanda Sobhy
- Northeastern University
- Sports-based youth development
- Squash (sport)
