= Sports-based youth development =

Sports-based youth development or SBYD is a theory and practice model for direct youth service. Grounded in youth development, sports psychology, and youth sports practice, SBYD aims to use the sport experience to contribute to positive youth development. Sports-based youth development is similar to sport for social development.

== Origins ==
The term "sports-based youth development program" was coined in 2006 at a summit sponsored by Harvard University's Program in Education, Afterschool and Resiliency (PEAR), Positive Learning Using Sports (PLUS), and the Vail Leadership Institute. SBYD programs were defined as programs that "use a particular sport... to facilitate learning and life skill development in youth".

== Characteristics ==
SBYD is based on the idea that sport programs should be intentionally designed to ensure youth have a positive, not negative, experience. SBYD programs are defined as sports programs with the following features:

- Physical and psychological safety
- Appropriate structure
- Supportive relationships
- Opportunities to belong
- Positive social norms
- Support for efficacy and mattering
- Opportunities for skill building
- Opportunities to foster cultural competence
- Active learning
- Opportunities for recognition
- Strength-based focus
- Ecological and holistic programs
- Integration of family, school, and community efforts

Others have applied best practices in youth development to the sport context and defined the factors most likely to facilitate psychosocial development as when youth are:

- Engaged in a desired activity with an appropriate environment (context)
- Surrounded by caring adult mentors and a positive group or community (external assets)
- Able to learn or acquire skills (internal assets) that are important for managing life situations
- Benefiting from the findings of a comprehensive system of evaluation and research

Organizations using the SBYD model can have different specific goals such as improved health, education, and delinquency prevention. Programs are often implemented in the after-school setting but can also be implemented in schools. SBYD programs do not need to completely devalue the competitive aspect of sport, but winning is not the central focus of the program. Often SBYD program target populations that typically have fewer opportunities for sport participation such as females and youth from low-income communities.

== Examples of organizations ==
=== Hoops 4 Hope ===
Hoops 4 Hope is a non-profit organization in South Africa that uses basketball to help children from underserved areas become proactive leaders in their individual lives and in their communities. It has been in existence for over 15 years. Hoops 4 Hope in conjunction with its sister organization Soccer 4 Hope has given 10,000 children the opportunity to participate in sports.

=== Up2Us Sports ===
Up2Us, doing business as Up2Us Sports, is a sport-based youth development non-profit organization founded in 2010 dedicated to supporting young people through sport. Through their national coach program, Up2Us identifies, trains and supports coaches, many of whom serve as AmeriCorps members, to work with young people in underserved communities around the country. Their training teaches strategies for coaches to work with young people who have dealt with trauma.

=== SquashBusters ===
SquashBusters is a New England–based organization that provides middle and high school students with academic tutoring and squash instruction. The program, which has existed since 1996, has served over 800 students. SquashBusters is a founding member of the National Urban Squash and Education Alliance, a nationwide association of urban squash programs.

=== Street Soccer USA ===
Street Soccer USA is a non-profit organization under the umbrella of HELP USA that promotes the growth and development of a national network of grassroots soccer programs to achieve social change. SSUSA aims to get homeless men, women, and youth off the streets through innovative, sports-based solutions to eradicate homelessness and poverty in the United States. As of 2010, SSUSA has 18 teams across the United States.

=== Reviving Baseball in Inner Cities ===
Reviving Baseball in Inner Cities (RBI) is a youth baseball program operated by Major League Baseball. This youth initiative is designed to provide young people from underserved and diverse communities the opportunity to play baseball and softball. The program was created by John Young in 1989 in Los Angeles, and now serves more than 200 communities.

=== Laureus Sport for Good Foundation USA ===
Laureus Sport for Good Foundation USA (Laureus USA) is a grant-making, nonprofit organization that supports the growth and deepens the impact of programs that use sport for social change. Their mission is to change the lives of youth and strengthen communities through the power of sport. Since 2012, they have impacted the lives of over one million youth by investing $30 million in sports-based youth development organizations around the country. In 2022, they invested in grants to over 80 organizations, impacting over 80,000 children and youth. Laureus USA focuses on supporting organizations that work in six social focus areas: health and well-being, education, women and girls, employability, inclusive society, and peaceful society.

The organization works nationally, with a key focus on opportunities for youth in New York City, Atlanta, New Orleans, Chicago, Los Angeles, Dallas, Miami, and the Twin Cities.
