= Social engagement =

Degree of participation in a community or society

Social engagement refers to the participation and interaction in activities that involve other people, like social relationships, communities or groups. It ranges from informal social interactions and activities to organised and more formal involvement in a community.

This concept is related, but different, to other concepts like social participation and civic engagement. The first one refers to people's involvement in activities with others, while the second one is concerned with activities with a more public concern or that contribute directly to a community life.

Several research was found that establishes a relation between social engagement and health and well being. But social engagement can be influenced by several factors, including individual, social and environmental factors.

== Definitions ==
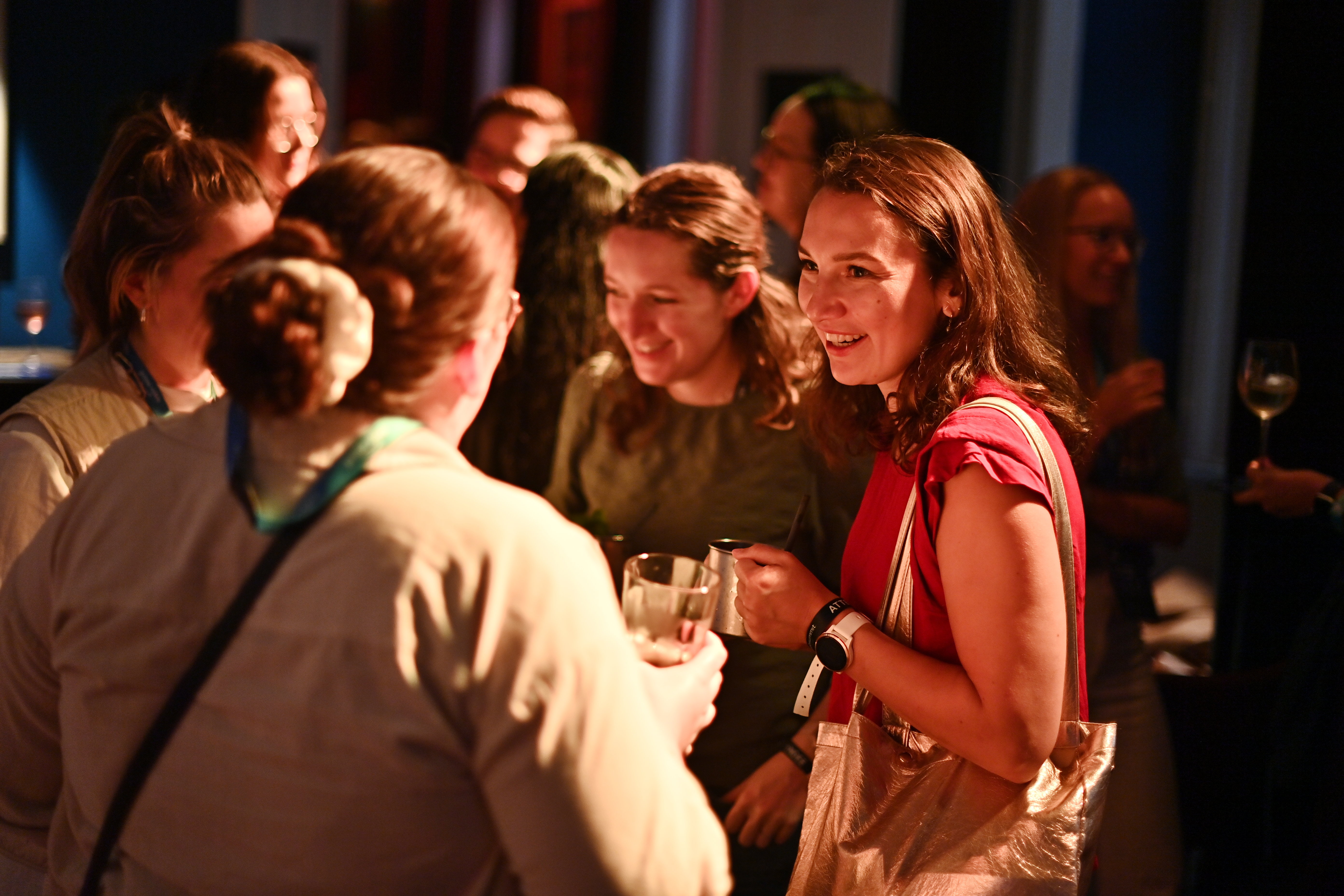
People socialising with drinks at a conference

Social engagement is defined by each individual's participation in a social group's activities.

It has also been previously defined as each individual's participation in some social roles or relationships, as well as the commitment level to keep relationships and a certain membership within a group.

Although being connected to various concept in different social sciences, its definition varies across literature. It is different from a social network, which is defined by the relationships among individuals or groups, and not their participation in social activities itself. One other concept that is related to social engagement is Social capital, that refers to the resources used in social relationships and connections. One final related concept is Civic engagement, which is more connected to political activities, civil organisations and volunteering.

Social engagement and social participation are two concepts that are also strongly connected but one is not used to substitute the other.

Using the 43 definitions of social participation reviewed in Levasseur et al. (2010), were proposed six different levels of involvement, ranging from the activities that contribute to society to activities used for preparation of social interactions. In this framework, social engagement is represented as a more specific way of participating towards others or the community.

== Characteristics ==
Social engagement can be evidenced by participation in collective activities, which reinforces social capital and social norms. Key elements of social engagement include activity (doing something), interaction (at least two people need to be involved in this activity), social exchange (the activity involves giving or receiving something from others), and lack of compulsion (there is no outside force forcing an individual to engage in the activity). For the most part, social engagement excludes activities for which one is getting paid, or family obligations.

A common metric of social engagement is the quantifiable volume of activity. A traditional form of social engagement, such as church going, may be measured by the number of one's visits to the church. In the Internet setting, a metric of social engagement on a discussion board may take the form of the number of posts made.

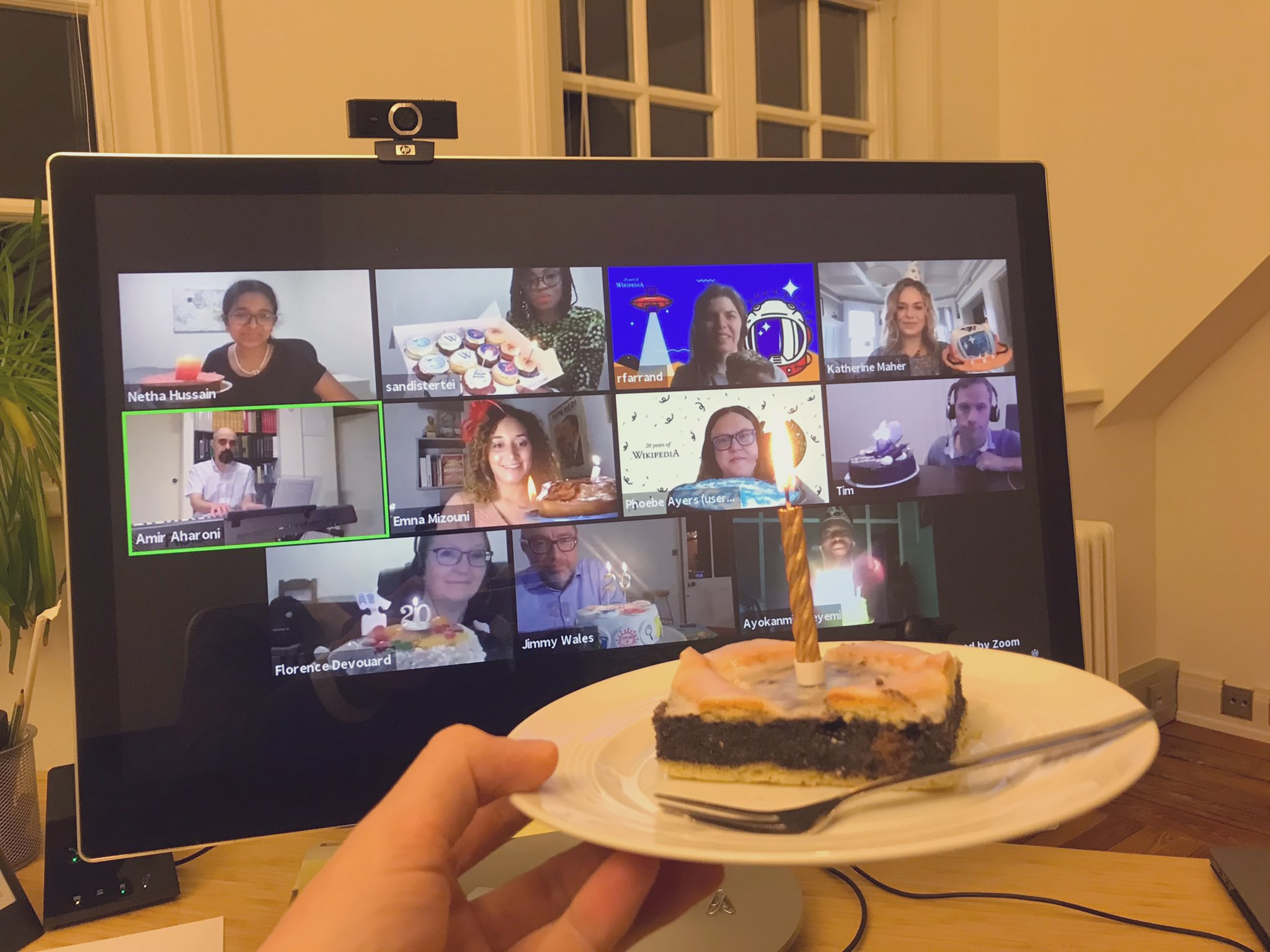
Social engagement in a virtual community

One of the main questions about social engagement explored by social scientists has been whether individuals are more or less engaged with various communities. Some studies have suggested that modern information and communication technologies have made it easier for individuals to become socially engaged in more distant or virtual communities, and thus have decreased their involvement in local communities.

Promotion of positive behavior in, and opportunities for, social engagement also serve as key goals in the field of positive youth development.

== Health ==
High social engagement has been studied to improve happiness, health and general well-being; however, its different effects depend on the context and nature of the different social interactions. High social engagement in deviant, delinquent activities, like participation in a criminal organisation may have negative effects on one's health. Too much involvement can also reflect negatively in one's health, like excessive stress for colliding responsibilities.

There was also research that has found a significant relationship between relationships and physical health. In an analysis made by Holt-Lunstad et al. (2010), it was found that people with stronger relationships had 50% more chance to live longer than people with weaker relationships. This research used 148 studies that involved 308 849 participants, and its highlights the link between social relationships and human health and expectancy of life.

The 2025 report by the World Health Organisation found that loneliness and social isolation were also related to negative health outcomes. It related social disconnection to conditions like cardiovascular disease, depression and anxiety, emphasising the fact that stronger relationships should be built to create better opportunities for social interactions.

The COVID-19 pandemic showed an example of how prohibitions on face to face interactions have a negative impact on social participation, as well as its negative contribution to loneliness and isolation.

== Social engagement and inclusion ==
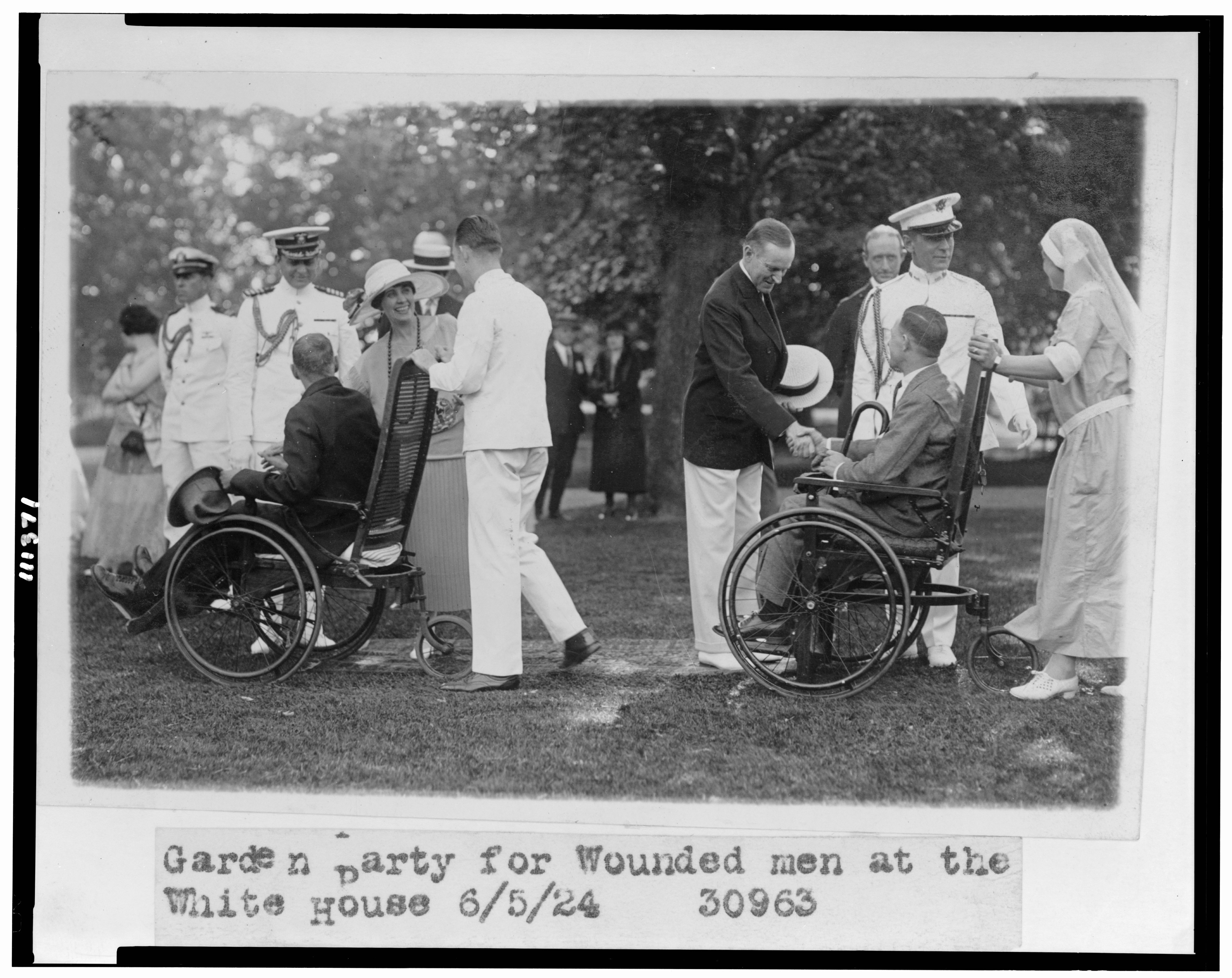
White house Party for disabled men as a form of inclusive social engagement

Poverty can greatly impact one's social participation. Engagement in social activities can be impacted by an individual's employment or the lack of it.

Social inclusion is critical to ensure that the needs of disadvantaged social groups such as indigenous peoples, persons with disabilities, older persons, youth, and women, are considered.

== Barriers and facilitators to social engagement ==
Social engagement is often influenced by several factors, like individual, social and environmental factors. These factors influence how willing people are to participate in social activities and the opportunities they are given. A research on older adults found that factors like health, personal motivation, social and economic conditions and existing relationships influence social participation.

Some of the individual factors that influence social engagement are health, motivation and demographic characteristics. This is studied on a review by Townsend et al. (2021), where health and motivation were showed to be the most important influences on social participation. This review checked 76 studies, and it shows great relevance of factors like age and social and economic status.

The social factors that have an influence on social engagement can include existing relationships and networks. The same research on adults shows that the size of a person's social network has great influence on that person's opportunities for social involvement, as well as neighbourhood environment can also determine if a person will or will not continue to engage in the community activities.

Environmental and institutional conditions such as transportation, physical accessibility and community availability, can create even more barriers to opportunities for social participation.

In a research by Simplican et al. (2015), there was an ecological model proposed of social inclusion. This model includes several factors such as individual, community, political, social and organisational factors, and is focused on people with some type of disability (both intelectual or development), and shows a great connection between interpersonal connections and social participation.

== Socially engaged theater ==
Socially engaged theater is performance work that comments on or raises awareness about social issues around race, gender, disability, sexuality, and equality. The audience is invited to participate in aspects of the performance.

== See also ==
- Civic engagement – Individual or group activity addressing issues of public concern
- Community engagement – Organizational efforts to benefit community
- Engaged hermeneutics – The study of the methodological principles of interpretation
- Positive youth development – Type of youth development program
