= Homelessness in France =

Homelessness in France is a significant social issue that is estimated to affect around 300,000 people - a figure that has doubled since 2012 (141,500) and tripled since 2001 (93,000). Around 185,000 people are currently staying in shelters, some 100,000 are in temporary housing for people seeking asylum and 16,000 live in slums. As of 2024, France has the second highest homeless population in Europe behind the UK.

One study of homeless in Paris found that homeless people have a high degree of social proximity to other people living in conditions of poverty. And terms in the media used to describe homelessness are formed around poverty and vagrancy.

Some researchers maintain that a Housing First policy would not solve the homelessness issue in France.

Some researchers maintain that industrial restructuring in France led to the loss of some jobs among blue-collar workers whose skills did not transfer readily to other job sectors, which in turn led to a rise in homelessness.

Homeless children in France is not a new phenomenon; the writer Emile Zola wrote about homeless children in late nineteenth century France.

The homeless emergency number in France is 115. The line is operated by SAMU Social.

== Responses ==
- French law prevents landlords from evicting their tenants during the winter months.
- Foyers originated in France during World War I to provide a place to eat and sleep for soldiers. After the war, foyers were used to provide accommodation for a movement of people across the country who were seeking work. It is thought that the service reduced the number of homeless unemployed youth.
- Christophe Robert, the general manager of the charity Fondation Abbé Pierre, has called for a special public fund of around 200 million euros to be established to help people pay rent and bills. He also wants "long term solutions for housing", urging the authorities to build 150,000 subsidised apartments.
- In 2007, the Droit au logement opposable (DALO) law was passed, creating an enforceable right to housing.
- In 2015, the Mobile Teams of the French Red Cross completed 11,000 rounds of street missions, which involved 200,000 encounters with 72,000 different people.

== Statistics ==
- In 2018, 566 homeless people died nationwide. More than 100 of these were in Paris alone.
- The greater Paris region alone accounts for 44% of homeless people.
- 62% of the homeless are men.
- The majority of homeless people live alone (62% are single and childless).
- 55% were born outside France. Persons in this group are more often accompanied by children (23,700 of the 30,700 children counted).
- Approximately one-fourth of French-speaking homeless persons are regularly employed or do odd jobs. The jobs are generally precarious or low-skilled.
- One-fourth had been victims of violence or abuse.
- Almost half of people living on the street are between the ages of 30 and 49, compared with 26% of people over 18 and 25% over 50.
- 14% of French homeless people have a university education and one in ten have a high school diploma.
- 75% of French people felt some form of solidarity with rough sleepers and 56% thought they might one day be in their position.
