= Children and Youth Services Review =

- Discipline: Social work
- Language: English
- Edited by: Elizabeth Fernandez, Michelle Johnson-Motoyama, Darcey H. Merritt, Aron Shlonsky

Publication details
- History: 1979-present
- Publisher: Elsevier
- Frequency: Monthly
- Impact factor: 3.3 (2020)

Standard abbreviations
- ISO 4: Child. Youth Serv. Rev.

Indexing
- ISSN: 0190-7409
- LCCN: 79644745
- OCLC no.: 04762661

Links
- Journal homepage; Online archive

Children and Youth Services Review is a monthly multidisciplinary journal covering the study of social service programs pertaining to children and youth. It was established in 1979 by Pergamon Press and is currently published by Elsevier, which acquired Pergamon in 1991. The editors are Elizabeth Fernandez, Steven Sek-yum Ngai, Darcey H. Merritt, Aron Shlonsky. According to the Journal Citation Reports, the journal has a 2022 impact factor of 3.3.

== See also ==
- Youth services
