= Foyer (housing model) =

Transitional housing method

The Foyer housing model is a method of transitional housing for youth that evolved from temporary housing for laborers in Europe. After World War II, foyers were used to provide accommodation for a movement of people from rural France to cities seeking work. The term "foyer" means hearth in French. They later developed to house migrant workers, primarily from Algeria, serving as a path to independent labor and accommodation.

The foyer model has evolved into a philosophy and housing program for supporting at risk young people focused on a supportive relationship between caregivers and residents. Implementations typically provide partially or fully subsidized housing and educational, vocational, or work opportunities, as well as counselling services.

In the late 1990s, youth homelessness and unemployment became a rising problem, and United Kingdom policymakers led by Sheila McKechnie proposed foyers as a combined solution, in an attempt to end the "no job no house, no house no job" cycle. Promising success in the United Kingdom sparked interest in Australia and the United States, leading to meta-studies of UK research and funding from the Australian federal government and philanthropic organizations in the US.

== Definition and principles ==
While the model began as a temporary form of housing for workers migrating to cities, most view the foyer model as a philosophical approach applied to concrete implementations of transitional housing. The Foyer Federation, an organization in the United Kingdom founded in 1992 to "innovate, champion service reform, and ensure the Foyer network can deliver the best quality offer for young people" defines the concept in a set of three promises:

1. a safe, balanced community of 16-25 year olds in transition
2. an integrated offer that covered housing, education, employment, and personal development skills
3. a relationship that tailored a 'something-for-something' deal between the young person, service, and locality, on which the offer of accommodation depended

Anderson, I. and Quilgars, D., two researchers who studied the effectiveness of the initial U.K. foyers in the early 1990s described the foyer concept as an "integrated approach to meeting the needs of young people during their transition from dependence to independence by linking affordable accommodation to training and employment". In general, young people need varying degrees and types of aid while making the transition into adulthood, and foyers aim to provide that aid to disadvantaged and at-risk individuals who may not have an alternative support system or may have complex needs. Motivating reasons for homelessness programs to specifically target youth include that youth require different types and quantities of support, and homelessness as a young person can lead to long-term homelessness which may be more difficult to address systemically.

== History and evolution ==
=== Post-war reconstruction in France ===
Following World War II, France was left in a thoroughly damaged state. Germany took an estimated 2.4 million French workers captive and destroyed over a million buildings, leaving over a million people homeless. With prisoners of war returning from Germany and a surge of young people migrating from rural to urban areas all seeking work, there was a serious lack of sufficient housing. It was increasingly clear that government intervention was necessary to provide aid to these its citizens. The French government responded by creating a HLM (rent-controlled housing) system. Participating HML organizations were authorized to build and rent out foyers. Typically, foyers were associated with a specific group, for example the (FJT), (Foyers for Young Workers) emerged to provide affordable housing for young workers leaving home for work in urban areas. Initially, construction of foyers was focused on the highest density area of young people, near Paris. Continuing through the 1960s and early 1970s, foyers continued to provide affordable housing for young people and other groups, such as migrants workers; however, they began to offer less comprehensive services such as social and educational opportunities. By the 1980s, foyers focusing on specific groups of people with specific needs began to develop, such as those focused on supporting migrant workers and troubled youth. While the housing was widely appreciated by supported groups, there was large criticism of foyers as limiting independence, with R. Lovett et al. reporting that many residing with FJT lamented that "[t]hey want us to be responsible, but they give us few rights".

=== Housing for migrant workers ===
In addition to housing young workers emigrating from rural France to urban areas, foyers housed workers immigrating during the reconstruction period and the decades after. Some foyers that were designed specifically for migrants were essentially under military control; they generally had a central room which individual residences were built around to allow easy supervision. Over time, these foyers housed different waves of French immigrants, and have become their own socially-governed institutions. So long as criminal activity isn't occurring, they're generally safe from intervention from political figures or policing. Such foyers intended to house migrant workers are sometimes referred to, albeit derogatively, as foyer-taudis. These foyers aren't generally reflective of the scope or philosophy as the general foyer housing model, however they offer limited and similar affordances to migrant workers by acting as somewhat of a standard path for immigrants in achieving long-term employment and accommodation. Concerns have been raised of the marginalization of immigrants, especially those who are Black African, as one in 10 live in a foyer-type establishment, and make up a significant 2.4% of the French population.

=== Application to youth employment and accommodation ===
While foyers in France were largely a response to housing shortages post-WWII, the UK began introducing foyers much later, when various factors resulted in rising demand for affordable housing for young people without an appropriate rise in supply. With more and more work shifting from agricultural and manufacturing industries to the service industry, young people were required to leave their homes and find housing closer to where they were working or studying. Indeed, the increase in post-secondary education, such as community colleges, which don't provide dormitories for students also contributed to this large increase in demand for affordable housing. However, the government did not appropriately anticipate this growing need, and cuts to housing subsidies combined with an increase in housing rates without a comparative increase in wages for young workers dried up the available affordable housing.

Towards the end of the 20th century, poorly skilled young workers in the UK began having significant difficulty finding employment that would pay for the increasingly expensive housing. Government intervention seemed inevitable, as this was an issue spanning social, economic, and housing sectors, as well as increasing research and sentiment that a successful transition into adulthood was predicated on proper training, supportive employment, and affordable housing. Sheila McKechnie, while the director of housing at the UK Charity Shelter, proposed adopting the French foyer model to provide a joint solution to these intertwined issues the youth faced.

== Evidence and outcomes ==
With the Foyer model growing in popularity in the U.K., groups in countries such as Australia are increasingly interested in evaluating whether the model is appropriate to implement. Many studies lament the lack of existing research, however Australian groups have published meta-studies on the existing literature, primarily that of the initial U.K. foyer projects.

An Australian report covering the financial viability of U.K. foyers found that the foyers typically charge a weekly fee. Some subsidize this fee within the foyer organization by staffing public facing businesses with foyer residents. The staff to resident ratio ranged from 1:6 to 1:20, and the bulk of the cost of the foyer was staff related. While most of the reported costs of the foyers On average, rent charged to residents covered less than 70% of the total costs with the rest covered by grants.

== Organisations ==
=== Australia ===
- Foyer Foundation – an Australian-based organisation, founded in 2008, promoting a network of Youth Foyers in Australia and New Zealand.
- Foyer Oxford – located on Oxford Street in Leederville, Western Australia.
- Illawarra Youth Foyer Project – established by Southern Youth and Family Services and is jointly funded by the Australian federal government and the NSW government.

=== England ===
- Foyer Federation – a UK-based organisation, providing learning and accommodation centers for youth in the form of Youth Foyers.
- Stonham Bude Foyer – located in Cornwall, England.
- Trident Foyer – founded in Birmingham, England in 1997 by Trident Housing Association.
- Ravenhead Foyer – founded in St Helens, Merseyside in 1997 by the former Grosvenor Housing Association (Now known as Your Housing Group).

=== Scotland ===
- Aberdeen Foyer – established in Aberdeen in 1995 in response to youth homelessness and unemployment issues.

=== United States ===
- Chelsea Foyer – located in New York City and run by Good Shepherd Services.
- Covenant House – located in more than 30 locations in North America and run by Covenant House, the largest privately funded charity focused on supporting homeless youth.
