= Allison Morris =

Criminologist in New Zealand

- Occupation: Criminologist
- Awards: FRSNZ

Academic background
- Education: University of Cambridge

Allison Margaret Morris FRSNZ (born 1945) is a retired New Zealand criminologist, specialising in youth justice, restorative justice and women in crime. She was elected a Fellow of the Royal Society Te Apārangi in 2000.

== Education ==
Morris earned a PhD from the University of Cambridge in 1976.

== Career ==
Morris was appointed as lecturer in criminology at Cambridge University in 1976, and promoted to Reader in Criminal Justice in 1995. She left the university in 1998. Morris was a full professor at Victoria University of Wellington before her retirement in 2001. She was elected a Fellow of the Royal Society Te Apārangi in 2000. The Society said Morris has "been recognised internationally as an outstanding criminologist whose evidence-led work, characterised by meticulous data collection, has had global influence. In her special field of the area of youth justice she has made New Zealand a virtual world laboratory for youth justice and her work is currently influencing policy in Australia and Britain as well as in New Zealand."

== Selected publications ==
- Morris, Margaret Allison (2002). "Critiquing the Critics: A Brief Response to Critics of Restorative Justice". The British Journal of Criminology. 42 (3): 596–615. doi:10.1093/bjc/42.3.596. Wikidata Q56169839.
- Morris, Margaret Allison (1987), Women, crime, and criminal justice, Blackwell Publishing, Wikidata Q109902087
- Morris, Margaret Allison; Gabrielle Maxwell, eds. (1 August 2003), Restorative justice for juveniles: conferencing, mediation and circles, Hart Publishing, Wikidata Q109902088
- Gelsthorpe, Loraine Ruth; Morris, Margaret Allison, eds. (1990), Feminist perspectives in criminology, Open University Press, Wikidata Q109902089
- Morris, Margaret Allison; Henri Giller (1987), Understanding juvenile justice, Croom Helm, Wikidata Q109902090
- Morris, Margaret Allison (1983). Providing criminal justice for children. Edward Arnold. ISBN 978-0-7131-6397-1. LCCN 84247502. OCLC 9836231. OL 2992453M. Wikidata Q109902091.
- Morris, Margaret Allison; M. W. McIsaac (1978). Juvenile justice? ; the practice of social welfare. Heinemann. ISBN 978-0-435-82601-7. LCCN 79300710. OCLC 5051389. OL 22021118M. Wikidata Q109902092.
- Morris, Margaret Allison (1997). Women's safety survey, 1996. ISBN 978-0-478-20128-4. LCCN 99488276. OCLC 56532639. OL 121691M. Wikidata Q109902093.
- Morris, Margaret Allison (1980), Justice for children, Macmillan Publishers, Wikidata Q109902094
- Gabrielle Maxwell; Morris, Margaret Allison (1993). Families, Victims and Culture: Youth Justice in New Zealand (PDF). Wellington: Social Policy Agency. ISBN 0-475-11017-X. Wikidata Q109902576.
