= Restorative practices =

Social science field

Restorative practices (or more accurately restorative justice practices) is a collective term describing the various methods through restorative justice implemented

Restorative justice practices aim to build healthy communities, increase social capital, decrease crime and antisocial behaviour, mend harm and restore relationships. The terms ties together research in a variety of social science fields, including education, psychology, social work, criminology, sociology, organizational development and leadership. RP has been growing in popularity since the early 2000s and varying approaches exist.

== Overview ==
The social science of restorative practices offers a common thread to tie together theory, research and practice in diverse fields such as education, counseling, criminal justice, social work and organizational management. Individuals and organizations in many fields are developing models and methodology and performing empirical research that share the same implicit premise, but are often unaware of the commonality of each other's efforts.

In education, restorative practices, such as circles and groups, provide opportunities for students to share their feelings, build relationships and solve problems, and when there is wrongdoing, to play an active role in addressing the wrong and making things right. Schools that implement restorative practices (RP) have been found to provide safe school environments through building quality relationships and a supportive community. Further, urban educators who carry out RP have observed a decrease in disciplinary issues and absenteeism, a heightened sense of community, as well as an increase in school safety and instructional time.

For example, in criminal justice, restorative circles and restorative conferences allow victims, offenders and their respective family members and friends to come together to explore how everyone has been affected by an offense and, when possible, to decide how to repair the harm and meet their own needs. In England's Criminal Justice System (CJS), prisons use RP to stimulate positive social interactions and decrease tension when situational challenges arise. Introduced in the 1990s in some of Europe's CJS, RP has improved relationships between the prisons' residents and their relatives through restorative family interventions.

In social work, family group decision-making (FGDM) or family group conferencing (FGC) processes empower extended families to meet privately, without professionals in the room, to make a plan to protect children in their own families from further violence and neglect or to avoid residential placement outside their own homes.

These various fields employ different terms, all of which fall under the rubric of restorative practices: In the criminal justice field the phrase used is "restorative justice"; in social work the term employed is "empowerment"; in education, talk is of "positive discipline" or "the responsive classroom"; and in organizational leadership "horizontal management" is referenced. The social science of restorative practices recognizes all of these perspectives and incorporates them into its scope.

=== Functions ===
The use of restorative practices has the potential to:

- reduce crime, violence and bullying
- improve human behavior
- strengthen civil society
- provide effective leadership
- restore relationships
- repair harm

== History ==
Restorative practices has its roots in restorative justice, a way of looking at criminal justice that emphasizes repairing the harm done to people and relationships rather than only punishing offenders.

In the modern context, restorative justice originated in the 1970s as mediation or reconciliation between victims and offenders. In Elmira, Ontario, Canada, near Kitchener, in 1974 Mark Yantzi, a probation officer, arranged for two teenagers to meet directly with their victims following a vandalism spree and agree to restitution. The positive response by the victims led to the world's first victim-offender reconciliation program, in Kitchener, with the support of the Mennonite Central Committee and collaboration with the local probation department. The concept subsequently acquired various names, such as victim-offender mediation and victim-offender dialogue as it spread through North America and to Europe through the 1980s and 1990s.

Restorative justice echoes ancient and indigenous practices employed in cultures all over the world, from Native American and First Nations to African, Asian, Celtic, Hebrew, Arab and many others.

Eventually modern restorative justice broadened to include communities of care as well, with victims' and offenders' families and friends participating in collaborative processes called conferences and circles. Conferencing addresses power imbalances between the victim and offender by including additional supporters. In the 2010s, federal and local governments in the US, as well as community organizations, requested schools decrease suspension rates. To provide an alternative to disciplinary measures like suspension, large urban school districts, like New York City Public Schools and the Los Angeles Unified School District, started implementing RP.

A major aspect of any restorative practice is neutrality. Though restorative practice aim to resolve issues within a group, the facilitation of the resolution is supposed to remain impartial. It is, therefore, important that facilitators of any restorative practice are neutral to the situation at issue. Some researchers also classify the study of restorative practice through the concept of process and values. In this framework, process refers to the specific actions taken to repair harms and/or build community. Values refer to the overarching principals that guide those actions and that differ from more traditional justice that may be punitive.

== Terminology ==
=== Family group conference ===
The family group conference (FGC) started in New Zealand in 1989 as a response to native Māori people's concerns with the number of their children being removed from their homes by the courts. It was originally envisioned as a family empowerment process, not as restorative justice. In North America it was renamed family group decision making (FGDM).

=== Restorative conferences ===
In 1991 the FGC was adapted by an Australian police officer, Terry O'Connell, as a community policing strategy to divert young people from court, into a restorative process often called a restorative conference. It has been called other names, such as a community accountability conference and victim-offender conference. In 1994 Marg Thorsborne, an Australian educator, was the first to use a restorative conference in a school.

=== Circles ===
A "circle" is a versatile restorative practice that can be used proactively, to develop relationships and build community or reactively, to respond to wrongdoing, conflicts and problems. Circles give people an opportunity to speak and listen to one another in an atmosphere of safety, decorum and equality. The circle process allows people to tell their stories and offer their own perspectives.

The circle has a wide variety of purposes: conflict resolution, healing, support, decision making, information exchange and relationship development. Circles offer an alternative to contemporary meeting processes that often rely on hierarchy, win-lose positioning and argument.

Circles can be used in any organizational, institutional or community setting. Circle time and morning meetings have been widely used in primary and elementary schools for many years and more recently in secondary schools and higher education. In industry, the quality circle has been employed for decades to engage workers in achieving high manufacturing standards. In 1992 Yukon Circuit Court Judge Barry Stewart pioneered the sentencing circle, which involved community members in helping to decide how to deal with an offender. In 1994 Mennonite Pastor Harry Nigh befriended a mentally challenged repeat sex offender by forming a support group with some of his parishioners, called a circle of support and accountability, which was effective in preventing re-offending.

Circles can be both proactive and reactive. Proactive circles aim to create a positive classroom or environmental climate as facilitators solicit the expression of opinions and ideas in a safe environment. Reactive circles, often called restorative circles, work in conjunction with proactive circles. When a specific behavior or incident impacts individuals in the class or group, restorative circles aim to restore the climate and culture of the group through conflict resolution. Sometimes specific restorative conferences may transpire, which are direct and individual conferences between specific parties to discuss and resolve troubling behaviors and emotions.

=== Difference between restorative justice and restorative practices ===
The notion of restorative practices evolved in part from the concept and practices of restorative justice. But from the emergent point of view of restorative practices, restorative justice can be viewed as largely reactive, consisting of formal or informal responses to crime and other wrongdoing after it occurs. Restorative practices also includes the use of informal and formal processes that precede wrongdoing, those that proactively build relationships and a sense of community to prevent conflict and wrongdoing.

=== Other terminology ===
The term restorative practices, along with terms like restorative approaches, restorative justice practices and restorative solutions, are increasingly used to describe practices related to or derived from restorative conferences and circles. These practices also include more informal practices (see Restorative Practices Continuum).

Use of restorative practices is now spreading worldwide, in education, criminal justice, social work, counseling, youth services, workplace, college residence hall and faith community applications. Notably, restorative practices can and do serve as reactionary tools in these settings but have also been successful when implemented as proactive pedagogy.

== Restorative practices continuum ==
Continuum of Restorative Practices (Wachtel)

Restorative practices are not limited to formal processes, such as restorative conferences or family group conferences, but range from informal to formal. On a restorative practices continuum, the informal practices include affective statements that communicate people's feelings, as well as affective questions that cause people to reflect on how their behavior has affected others. Impromptu restorative conferences, groups and circles are somewhat more structured but do not require the elaborate preparation needed for formal conferences. Moving from left to right on the continuum, as restorative practices become more formal, they involve more people, require more planning and time, and are more structured and complete. Although a formal restorative process might have dramatic impact, informal practices have a cumulative impact because they are part of everyday life.

The aim of restorative practices is to develop community and to manage conflict and tensions by repairing harm and building relationships. This statement identifies both proactive (building relationships and developing community) and reactive (repairing harm and restoring relationships) approaches. Organizations and services that only use the reactive without building the social capital beforehand are less successful than those that also employ the proactive.

== Social discipline window ==
Social Discipline Window. (Wachtel & McCold, adapted from Glaser, 1969)

The social discipline window is a concept with broad application in many settings. It describes four basic approaches to maintaining social norms and behavioral boundaries. The four are represented as different combinations of high or low control and high or low support. The restorative domain combines both high control and high support and is characterized by doing things with people (collaboratively), rather than to them (coercively) or for them (without their involvement).

The social discipline window also defines restorative practices as a leadership model for parents in families, teachers in classrooms, administrators and managers in organizations, police and social workers in communities and judges and officials in government. The fundamental unifying hypothesis of restorative practices is that "people are happier, more cooperative and productive, and more likely to make positive changes when those in positions of authority do things with them, rather than to them or for them." This hypothesis maintains that the punitive and authoritarian to mode and the permissive and paternalistic for mode are not as effective as the restorative, participatory, engaging with mode.

The social discipline window reflects the thinking of Australian criminologist John Braithwaite, who has asserted that reliance on punishment as a social regulator is problematic because it shames and stigmatizes wrongdoers, pushes them into a negative societal subculture and fails to change their behavior. The restorative approach, on the other hand, reintegrates wrongdoers back into their community and reduces the likelihood that they will reoffend.

== Implementations of restorative practices ==
=== Educational system ===
There has been an accumulation of RP experiences in schools. Research on these seems to validate that RP has led to a decrease in disciplinary measures and slight diminishment in racial exclusionary gaps. One goal of RP has been to close the racial disciplinary gap since students of color, especially African American children, are suspended more frequently than white students. According to a 2018 US Office of Civil Rights study of the 2015-16 school year, Black boys made up approximately one twelfth (8%) of enrolled students but one fourth (25%) of suspended students.

In a 2020 survey of fifth and eighth graders, students found RP's restorative circles (RC) as a valuable method of expression and of sharing perspectives about problems. Students use RP as a way to express their thoughts and feelings, and encourage intercommunication. Schools have used classroom conferencing to address disruption that has had an effect on learning. In such a situation, RP has helped teachers and students discuss behavioral expectations from one another. In New Zealand, schools have experienced best restorative outcomes when all parties actively participate and understand how the problem originated, what should be done, and how the parties can reach a shared commitment that the issue not repeat itself.

=== Prison system ===
RP has served to attend concerns of legitimacy, fairness, and accountability. Restorative conversations and circles, and family interventions, have played a positive role in building relationships between residents, officers, and families. In one of England's prisons, residents and officers made use of a restorative circle to resolve a kitchen issue. Since the residents left the kitchen untidy on repeated occasions, the officers punitively closed the kitchen for a couple of days. However, the closing of the kitchen created bitterness among the residents, one of whom proposed to carry out a restorative circle to establish a kitchen code of conduct. Initially hesitant to participate, the officers eventually helped mediate the residents' agreement; the officers' presence provided a sense of security to the prisoners.

== Criticisms ==
There have been criticisms of RP from different perspectives. RP interventions among elementary-aged school children seem to be more impactful than among early teens or teenaged children. The effectiveness of interventions across grade levels must be examined. Additionally, RP expectations may be unrealistic. Out of numerous RP components, schools may only implement RP circles yet await a shift in school climate. In prison systems, RP is viewed as a soft option and counter to prison values by some officers.
