= Human–wildlife conflict =

Negative interactions between people and wild animals

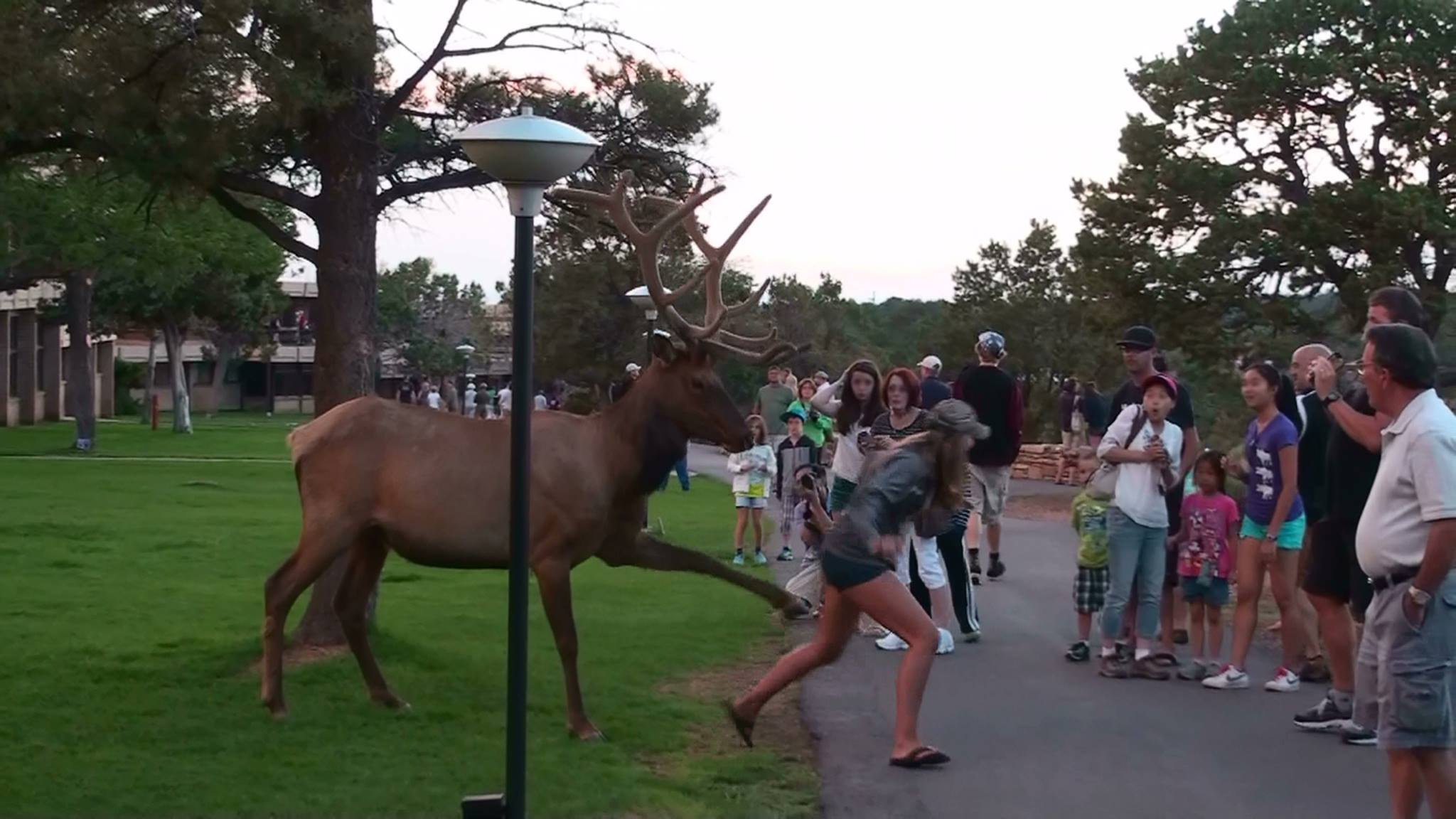
Grand Canyon National Park in Arizona hosts millions of visitors every year and is home to a population of Rocky Mountain elk. Interactions between humans and the elk sometimes result in injuries.

Human–wildlife conflict (HWC) refers to the negative interactions between humans and wild animals, with undesirable consequences both for people and their resources on the one hand, and wildlife and their habitats on the other. HWC, caused by competition for natural resources between human and wildlife, influences human food security and the well-being of both humans and other animals. In many regions, the number of these conflicts has increased in recent decades as a result of human population growth and the transformation of land use.

HWC is a serious global threat to sustainable development, food security and conservation in urban and rural landscapes alike. In general, the consequences of HWC include: crop destruction, reduced agricultural productivity, competition for grazing lands and water supply, livestock predation, human injury and death, damage to infrastructure, and increased risk of disease transmission among wildlife and livestock.

As of 2013, many countries have started to explicitly include human-wildlife conflict in national policies and strategies for wildlife management, development and poverty alleviation. At the national level, collaboration between forestry, wildlife, agriculture, livestock and other relevant sectors is key.

As of 2020, conflict mitigation strategies utilized lethal control, translocation, population size regulation and endangered species preservation. Recent management now uses an interdisciplinary set of approaches to solving conflicts. These include applying scientific research, sociological studies and the arts to reducing conflicts. As human-wildlife conflict inflicts direct and indirect consequences on people and animals, its mitigation is an important priority for the management of biodiversity and protected areas. Resolving human-wildlife conflicts and fostering coexistence requires well-informed, holistic and collaborative processes that take into account underlying social, cultural and economic contexts.

Coexistence Specialist Group published the IUCN SSC Guidelines on human-wildlife conflict and coexistence that aim to provide foundations and principles for good practice, with clear, practical guidance on how best to tackle conflicts and enable coexistence with wildlife.

== Meaning ==
Human–wildlife conflict has been defined by the World Wide Fund for Nature (WWF) in 2004 as "any interaction between humans and wildlife that results in negative impacts of human social, economic or cultural life, on the conservation of wildlife populations, or on the environment". The Creating Co-existence workshop at the 5th Annual World Parks Congress (8–17 September 2003, Montreal) defined human-wildlife conflict in the context of human goals and animal needs as follows: "Human-wildlife conflict occurs when the needs and behavior of wildlife impact negatively on the goals of humans or when the goals of humans negatively impact the needs of wildlife."

A 2007 review by the United States Geological Survey defined human-wildlife conflict in two contexts; firstly, actions by wildlife conflict with human goals i.e. life, livelihood and life-style, and secondly, human activities that threaten the safety and survival of wildlife. However, in both cases outcomes are decided by human responses to the interactions.

The Government of Yukon defined human-wildlife conflict simply, but through the lens of damage to property, i.e. "any interaction between wildlife and humans which causes harm, whether it's to the human, the wild animal, or property." Here, property includes buildings, equipment and camps, livestock and pets, but does not include crops, fields or fences.

In 2020, the IUCN SSC Human-Wildlife Conflict Task Force described human-wildlife conflict as "struggles that emerge when the presence or behaviour of wildlife poses actual or perceived, direct and recurring threat to human interests or needs, leading to disagreements between groups of people and negative impacts on people and/or wildlife".

== History ==
Human-wildlife interactions have occurred throughout man's prehistory and recorded history. An early form of human-wildlife conflict is the depredation of the ancestors of prehistoric man by a number of predators of the Miocene such as saber-toothed cats, leopards, and spotted hyenas.

Fossil remains of early hominids show evidence of depredation; the Taung Child, the fossilized skull of a young Australopithecus africanus, is thought to have been killed by an eagle from the distinct marks on its skull and the fossil having been found among egg shells and remains of small animals.

A Plio-Pleistocene horned crocodile, Crocodylus anthropophagus, whose fossil remains have been recorded from Olduvai Gorge, was the largest predator encountered by prehistoric man, as indicated by hominid specimens preserving crocodile bite marks from these sites.

In 2023 alone, over 1.8 million distinct human-wildlife conflicts occurred as animal involved auto accidents on roadways, seen as roadkill. Understanding bird strike frequency is important to aircraft safety engineers. Reducing the frequent animal collisions (strikes) from automobiles on roadways are shared concerns of biologists, civil engineers, and automobile safety designers.

As of 2020, with specific reference to forests, a high density of large ungulates such as deer, can cause severe damage to the vegetation and can threaten regeneration by trampling or browsing small trees, rubbing themselves on trees or stripping tree bark. This behavior can have important economic implications and can lead to polarization between forest and wildlife managers.

== Examples ==
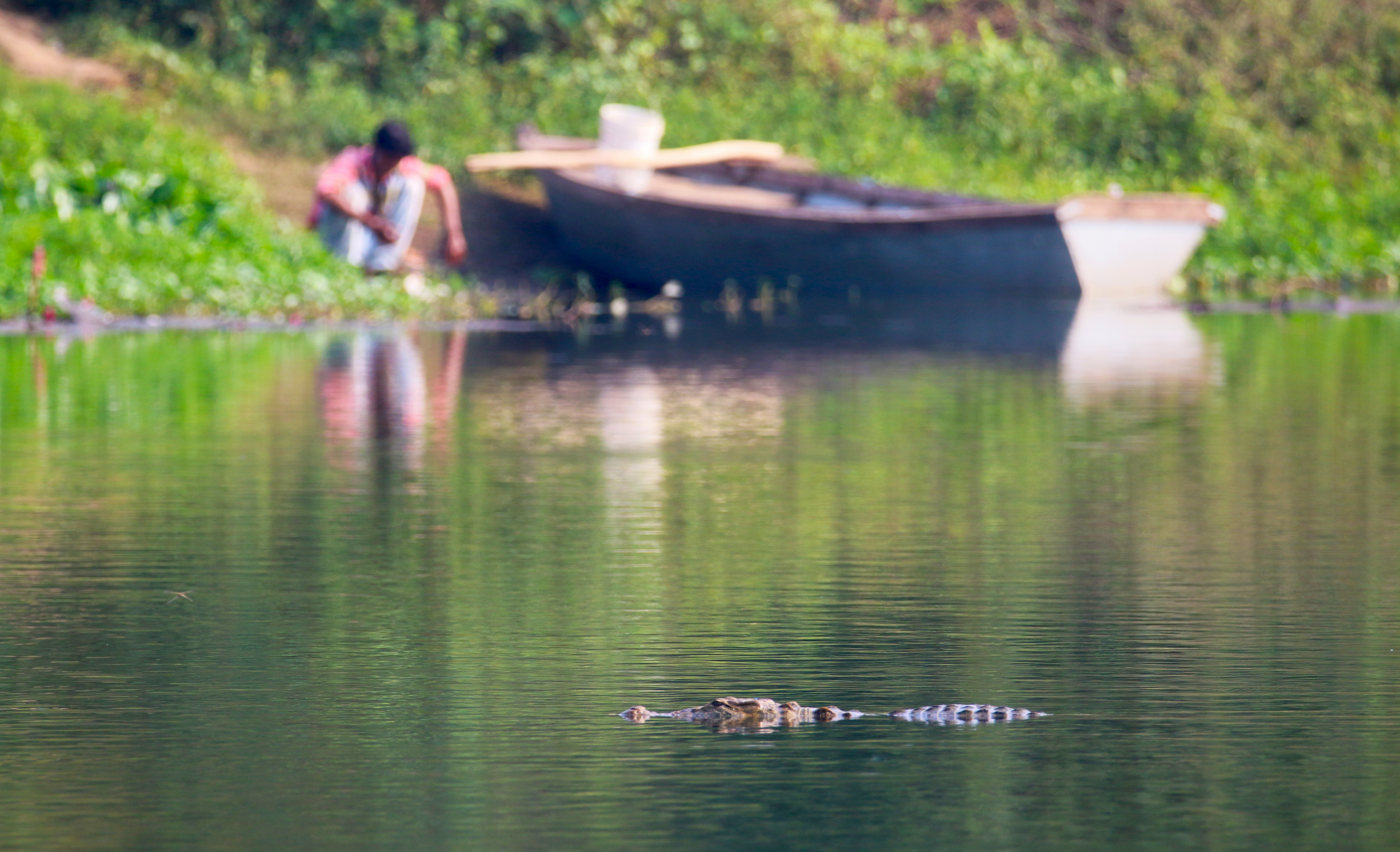
Simultaneous use of water resources by humans and crocodiles sets up occasions for human-wildlife conflict

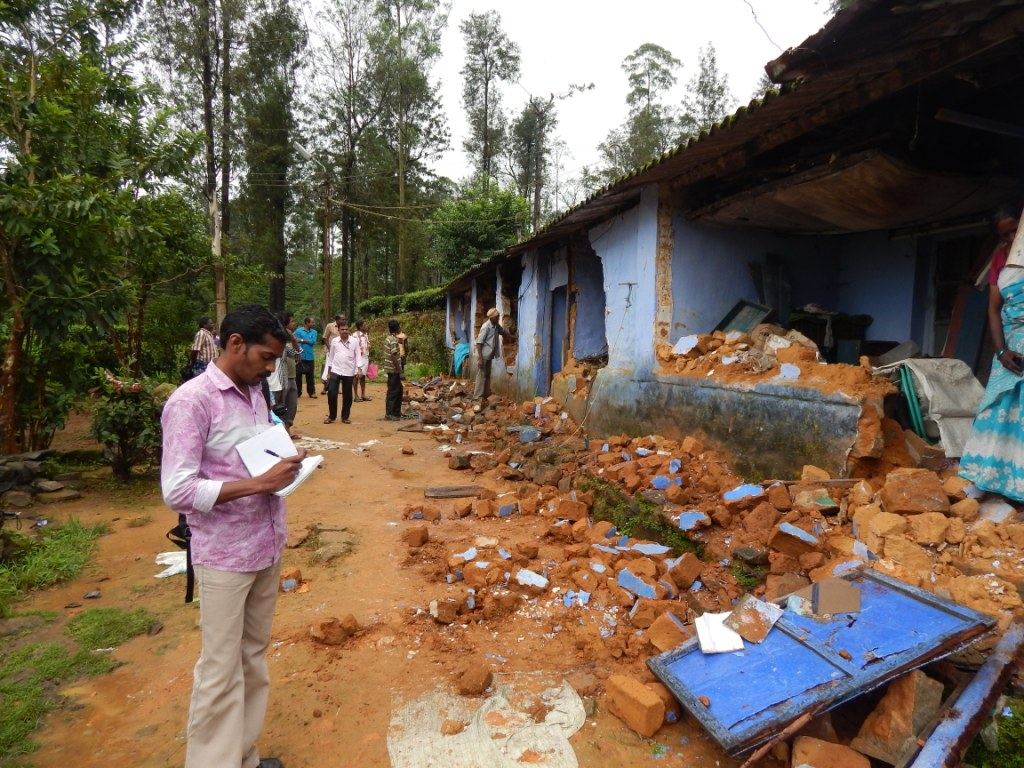
Asian elephant damage to houses

=== By species ===
==== Feral cat ====
Feral cat in New Zealand have become a major driver of native wildlife decline, prompting the government to include them in its Predator Free 2050 program.

==== Sparrow ====
During the Four Pests campaign in Maoist China (1958–1960), the Eurasian tree sparrow was targeted for extermination due to its consumption of grain and seeds. Massive culling efforts—including nest destruction, egg breaking, and widespread hunting by citizens—led to a near-extinction of sparrows in China. The campaign caused severe ecological disruption, contributing to locust outbreaks, decreased crop yields, and part of the Great Chinese Famine, resulting in millions of human deaths.

==== Rabbits ====
European Rabbits in Australia were introduced to Australia in the 18th century. Thomas Austin's release of a small number of rabbits in 1859 led to a population explosion, causing severe ecological damage and agricultural losses. Control measures have included shooting, destroying warrens, fencing, and biological control such as the myxoma virus and rabbit hemorrhagic disease (RHD).

==== Monkey ====
Agricultural expansion push rhesus macaques into human settlements. In Nepal and India, crop raiding causes significant financial losses and negative perceptions of macaques, leading to actions such as culling and management programs.

=== By continent ===
==== Africa ====
As a tropical continent with substantial anthropogenic development, Africa is a hotspot for biodiversity and therefore, for human-wildlife conflict. Two of the primary examples of conflict in Africa are human-predator (lions, leopards, cheetahs, etc.) and human-elephant conflict. Depredation of livestock by African predators is well documented in Kenya, Namibia, Botswana, and more. African elephants frequently clash with humans, as their long-distance migrations often intersect with farms. The resulting damage to crops, infrastructure, and at times, people, can lead to the retaliatory killing of elephants by locals.

In 2017, more than 8,000 human-wildlife conflict incidents were reported in Namibia alone (World Bank, 2019). Hyenas killed more than 600 cattle in the Zambezi Region of Namibia between 2011 and 2016 and there were more than 4,000 incidents of crop damage, mostly caused by elephants moving through the region (NACSO, 2017a).

==== Asia ====
With a rapidly increasing human population and high biodiversity, interactions between people and wild animals are becoming more and more prevalent in Asia. Attacks on humans and livestock have exacerbated major threats to tiger conservation such as mortality, removal of individuals from the wild, and negative perceptions of the animals from locals. Even non-predator conflicts are common, with crop-raiding by elephants and macaques persisting in both rural and urban environments. For example, as a result of the human-elephant conflict in Sri Lanka each year as many as 80 people are killed by elephants and more than 230 elephants are killed by farmers. The Sri Lankan elephant is listed as endangered, and only 2,500–4,000 individuals remain in the wild. Poor disposal of hotel waste in tourism-dominated towns has altered behaviours of carnivores such as sloth bears that usually avoid humans. In another example, tigers of Pilibhit Tiger Reserve in northern India have dispersed beyond the designated core zone of the reserve area into adjacent agricultural lands, commonly referred as sugarcane tigers. These tigers have killed more than 36 humans between 2014-24.

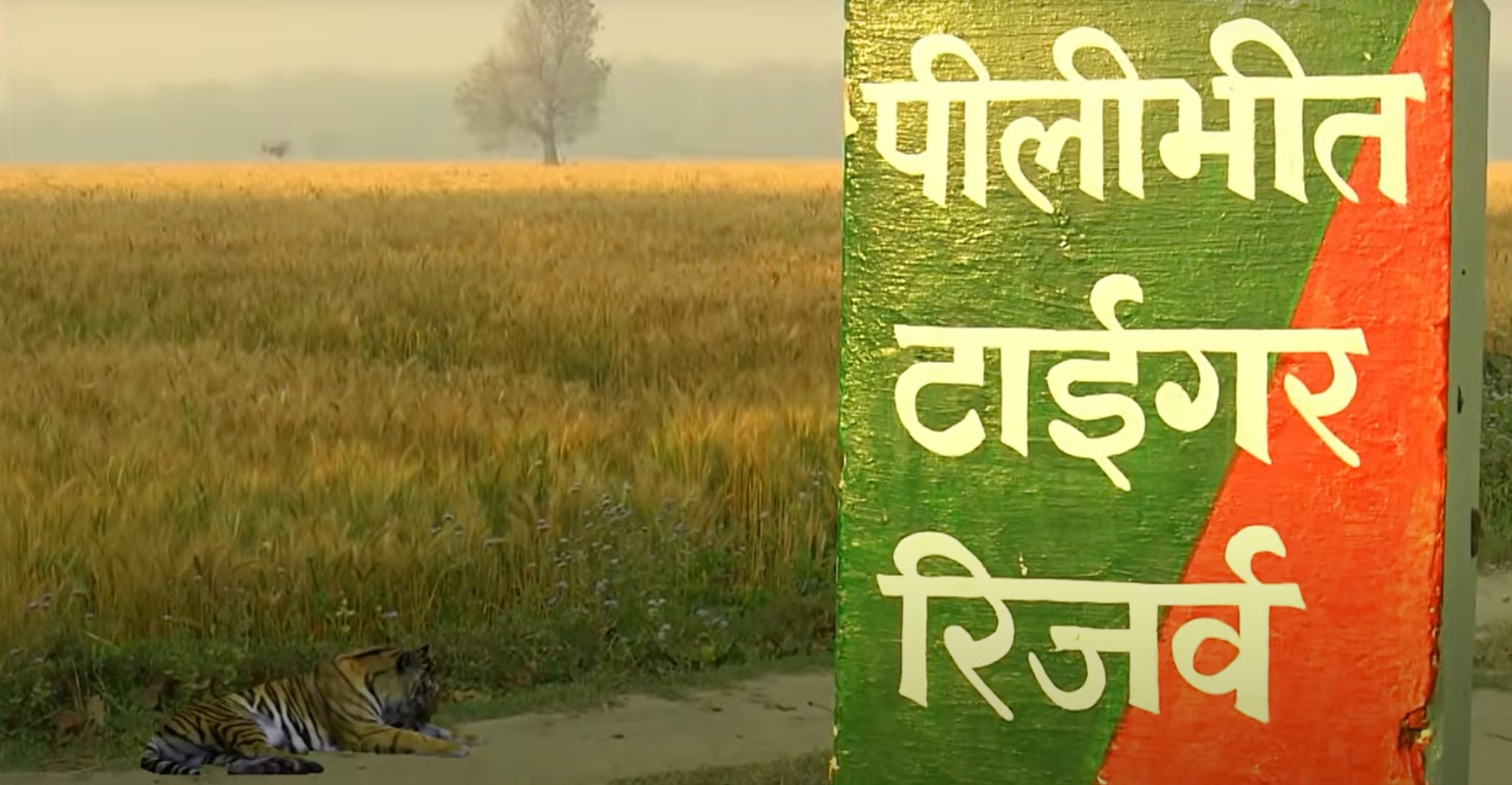
Tigers straying in the agricultural lands are often called sugarcane tigers.

As of 2021, in India and Kerala the conflict is exceedingly acute because of the country's Wildlife Protection Act.

In Japan, some wildlife is considered sacred, and in some cases religious and political protections are implemented. For example, in Nara City, Japan, the sacred Japanese sika deer (Cervus nippon), protected for over a millennium, has recently seen a population surge around Nara Park, causing agricultural devastation in the surrounding area. Genetic analysis reveals mixing between sacred deer from the sanctuary and common lineage deer, posing a risk to the sacred deer's unique genetics. This situation presents a complex challenge where cultural, economic, and religious interests are at odds with the interests of local farmers, who might otherwise lobby for the deer to be culled.

==== Antarctica ====
In Antarctica, the first known instance of death due to human-wildlife conflict occurred in 2003, when a leopard seal dragged a snorkeling British marine biologist underwater where she drowned.

==== Europe ====
Human–wildlife conflict in Europe includes interactions between people and both carnivores and herbivores. A variety of non-predators such as deer, wild boar, rodents, and starlings have been shown to damage crops and forests. Carnivores like raptors and bears create conflict with humans by eating both farmed and wild fish, while others like lynxes and wolves prey upon livestock. Even less apparent cases of human-wildlife conflict can cause substantial losses; 500,000 deer-vehicle collisions in Europe (and 1-1.5 million in North America) led to 30,000 injuries and 200 deaths.

==== North America ====
Instances of human-wildlife conflict are widespread in North America. In the state of Wisconsin, wolf depredation of livestock is a prominent issue that resulted in the injury or death of 377 domestic animals over a 24-year span. Similar incidents were reported in the Greater Yellowstone ecosystem, with reports of wolves killing pets and livestock. Expanding urban centers have created increasing human-wildlife conflicts, with interactions between humans, coyotes, and mountain lions documented in cities in Colorado and California, among others. Mountain lions are a similar source of conflict in central Mexico, where reports of livestock depredation are widespread, while interactions between humans and coyotes were observed in the Canadian province of Alberta as well.

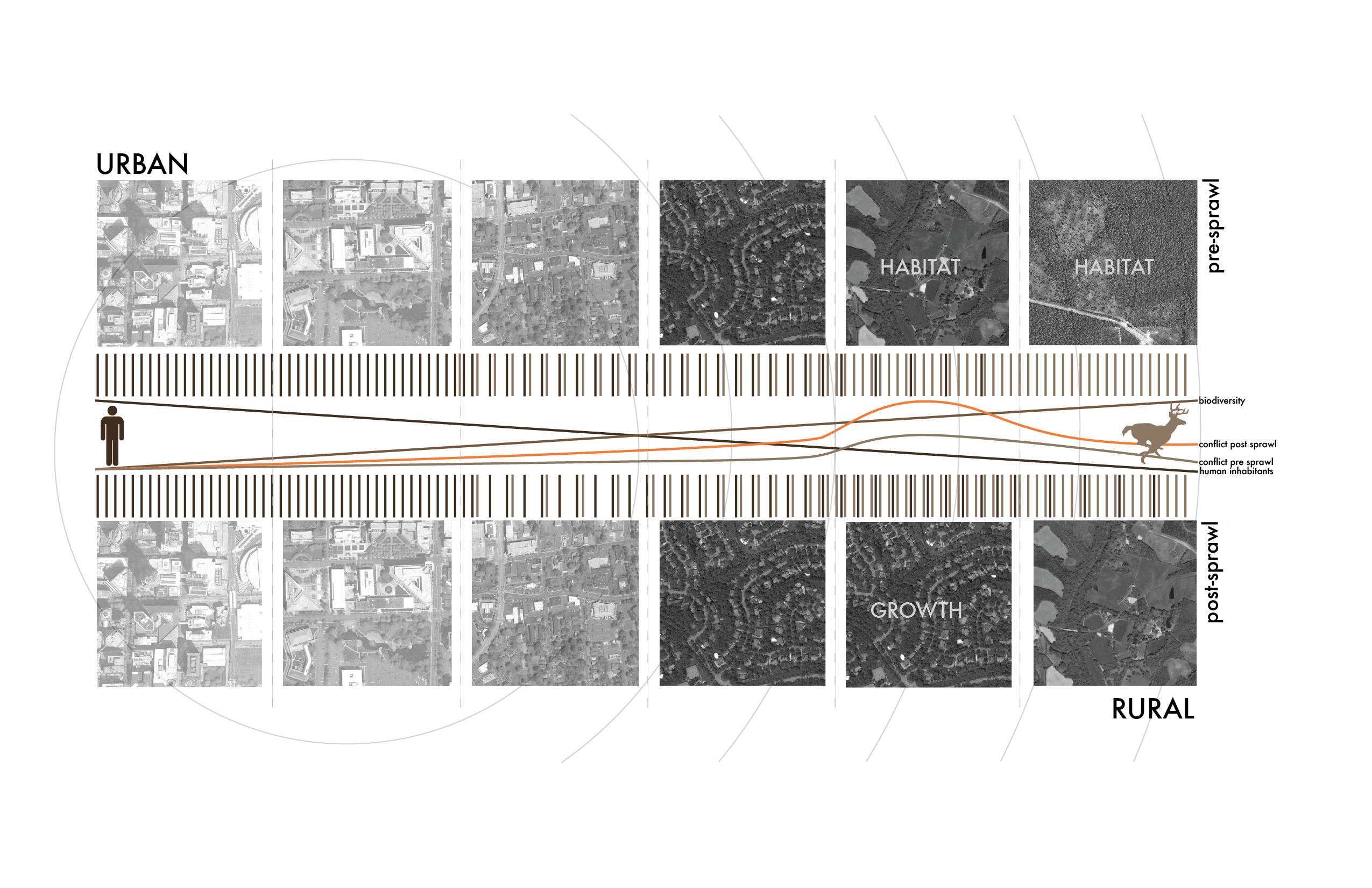
Diagram of Human Wildlife Conflict in Expanding American Cities

==== Oceania ====
On K'gari-Fraser Island in Australia, attacks by wild dingoes on humans (including the well-publicized death of a child) created a human-wildlife crisis that required scientific intervention to manage. In New Zealand, distrust and dislike of introducing predatory birds (such as the New Zealand falcon) to vineyard landscapes led to tensions between people and the surrounding wildlife. In extreme cases, large birds have been reported to attack people who approach their nests, with human-magpie conflict in Australia being a well-known example. Even conflict in urban environments has been documented, with development increasing the frequency of human-possum interactions in Sydney.

==== South America ====
As with most continents, the depredation of livestock by wild animals is a primary source of human-wildlife conflict in South America. The killings of guanacos by predators in Patagonia, Chile – which possess both economic and cultural value in the region – have created tensions between ranchers and wildlife. South America's only species of bear, the Andean Bear, faces population declines due to similar conflict with livestock owners in countries like Ecuador.

==== Marine ecosystems ====
While many of the causes of human-wildlife conflict are the same between terrestrial and marine ecosystems (depredation, competition, human injury, etc.), as of 2019, ocean environments have been less studied and management approaches often differ. As with terrestrial conflict, human-wildlife conflict in aquatic environments is diverse and extends across the globe. In Hawaii, for example, an increase in monk seals around the islands has created a conflict between locals who believe that seals "belong" and those who do not. Marine predators such as killer whales and fur seals compete with fisheries for food and resources, while others like great white sharks have a history of injuring humans.

In the summer of 2022, a 1,300-pound walrus appeared in Oslo harbor and moved in highly populated areas. Norwegian authorities declared her a threat to human safety as she had threatened to sink boats, and she was consequently euthanized. In April 2023, a life sized bronze sculpture of her was installed at Kongen Marina to "create a historic document about the case".

== Mitigation strategies ==
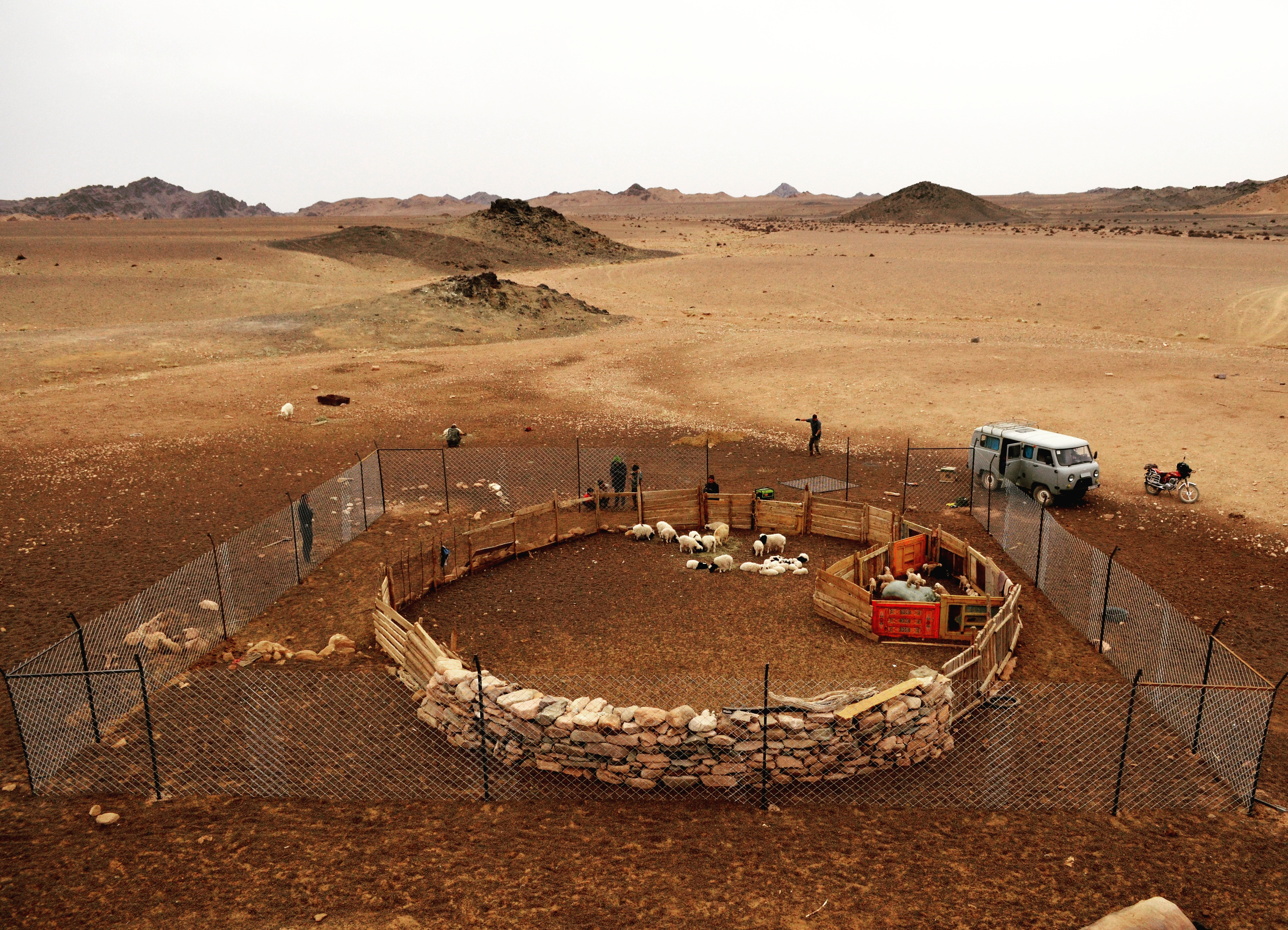
A traditional livestock corral surrounded by a predator-proof corral in South Gobi desert, Mongolia, to protect livestock from predators like snow leopard and wolf.

Mitigation strategies for managing human-wildlife conflict vary significantly depending on location and type of conflict. The preference is always for passive, non-intrusive prevention measures but often active intervention is required to be carried out in conjunction. Regardless of approach, the most successful solutions are those that include local communities in the planning, implementation, and maintenance. Resolving conflicts, therefore, often requires a regional plan of attack with a response tailored to the specific crisis. Still, there are a variety of management techniques that are frequently employed to mitigate conflicts. Examples include:

- Translocation of problematic animals: Relocating so-called "problem" animals from a site of conflict to a new place is a mitigation technique used in the past, although recent research has shown that this approach can have detrimental impacts on species and is largely ineffective. Translocation can decrease survival rates and lead to extreme dispersal movements for a species, and often "problem" animals will resume conflict behaviors in their new location.
- Erection of fences or other barriers: Building barriers around cattle bomas, creating distinct wildlife corridors, and erecting beehive fences around farms to deter elephants have all demonstrated the ability to be successful and cost-effective strategies for mitigating human-wildlife conflict.
- Improving community education and perception of animals: Various cultures have myriad views and values associated with the natural world, and how wildlife is perceived can play a role in exacerbating or alleviating human-wildlife conflict. In one Masaai community where young men once obtained status by killing lions, conservationists worked with community leaders to shift perceptions and allow those young men to achieve the same social status by protecting lions instead.
- Effective land use planning: altering land use practices can help mitigate conflict between humans and crop-raiding animals. For example, in Mozambique, communities started to grow more chili pepper plants after making the discovery that elephants dislike and avoid plants containing capsaicin. This creative and effective method discourages elephants from trampling community farmers' fields as well as protects the species.
- Compensation: in some cases, governmental systems have been established to offer monetary compensation for losses sustained due to human-wildlife conflict. These systems hope to deter the need for retaliatory killings of animals, and to financially incentivize the co-existing of humans and wildlife. Compensation strategies have been employed in India, Italy, and South Africa, to name a few. The success of compensation in managing human-wildlife conflict has varied greatly due to under-compensation, a lack of local participation, or a failure by the government to provide timely payments.
- Spatial analyses and mapping conflict hotspots: mapping interactions and creating spatial models has been successful in mitigating human-carnivore conflict and human-elephant conflict, among others. In Kenya, for example, using grid-based geographical information systems in collaboration with simple statistical analyses allowed conservationists to establish an effective predictor for human-elephant conflict.
- Predator-deterring guard dogs: The use of guard dogs to protect livestock from depredation has been effective in mitigating human-carnivore conflict around the globe. A recent review found that 15.4% of study cases researching human-carnivore conflict used livestock-guarding dogs as a management technique, with animal losses on average 60 times lower than the norm.
- Managing garbage and artificial feeding to prevent attraction of wildlife: Many wildlife species are attracted to garbage, especially including food wastes, leading to negative interactions with people. Poor disposal of garbage such as hotel waste is rapidly emerging as an important aspect that heightens human-carnivore conflicts in countries such as India. Urgent research to increase knowledge of the impact of easily available garbage is needed, and improving management of garbage in areas where carnivores reside is essential. Managing garbage disposal and artificial feeding of primates can also reduce conflicts and opportunities for disease transmission. One study found that prohibiting tourists from feeding Japanese macaques reduced aggressive interactions between macaques and people.
- Use of technology: Rapid technology development (especially Information Technology) can play a vital role in the prevention of Human–wildlife conflict. Drones and mobile applications can be used to detect the movements of animals and warn highways and railways authorities to prevent collisions of animals with vehicles and trains. SMS or WhatsApp messaging systems have also been used to alert people about the presence of animals in nearby areas. Early warning Wireless systems have been successfully used in undulating and flat terrain to mitigate human-elephant conflict in Tamil Nadu, India.

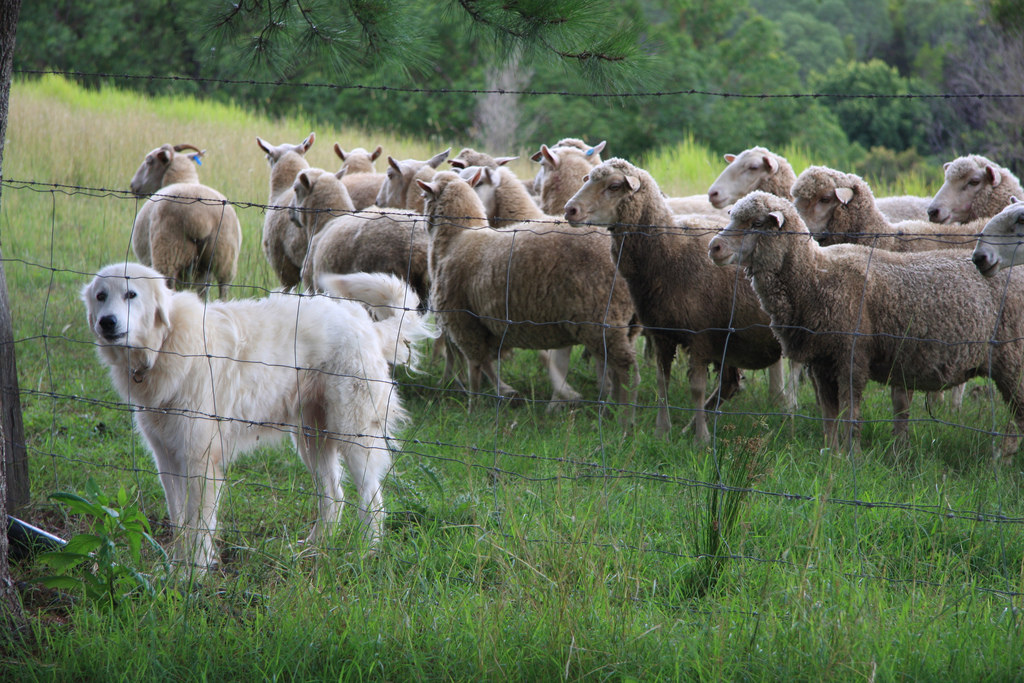
Livestock guardian dogs can be an effective and popular way of deterring predators and reducing human-carnivore conflicts.

== Hidden dimensions of the conflict ==
Human wildlife conflict also has a range of hidden dimensions that are not typically considered when the focus is on visible consequences. These can include health impacts, opportunity costs, and transaction costs. As of 2013, case studies have included work on elephants in Uttarakhand, northeast India, where human-elephant interactions are correlated with increased imbibing of alcohol by crop guardians resulting in enhanced mortality in interactions. and issues related to gender in northern India. In addition, research has shown that the fear caused by the presence of predators can aggravate human-wildlife conflict more than the actual damage produced by encounters.

== See also ==
- Animal resistance
- Human–lion conflict
- Aldo Leopold
- Biophilia hypothesis
- Disturbance (ecology)
- Ecopsychology
- Human impact on the environment
- Poaching
- Wildland–urban interface
- List of large carnivores known to prey on humans
- Human-elephant conflict in Kerala
- Man-eating animals

== Sources ==
This article incorporates text from a free content work. Licensed under CC BY-SA 3.0 IGO (license statement/permission). Text taken from The State of the World's Forests 2020. Forests, biodiversity and people – In brief, FAO & UNEP, FAO & UNEP.
