= Homeless shelter =

Service agency and institution that provides temporary residence for homeless people

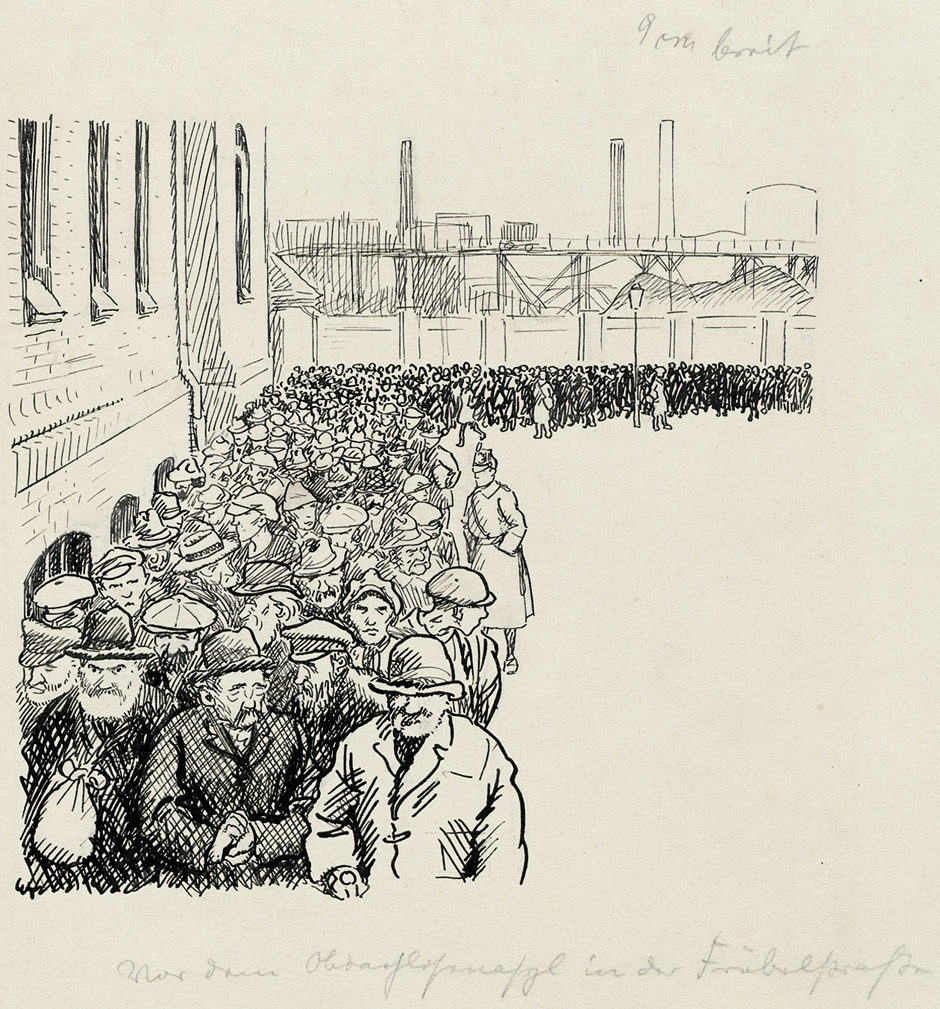
Illustration of homeless men waiting outside of a municipal shelter in Berlin by Willibald Krain (1925)

A homeless shelter is a type of service and total institution that provides temporary residence for homeless individuals and families. Shelters exist to provide residents with safety and protection from exposure to the weather while reducing their impact on the surrounding community.

They are similar to, but distinguishable from, various types of emergency shelters, which are typically operated for specific circumstances and populations, such as those affected by natural disasters or experiencing domestic abuse. They are distinguished from single-room occupancy lodgings, flophouses and other low-cost accommodations by typically being free and operated by municipal governments or nonprofit organizations. Homeless shelters may provide additional services, such as warm meals, counseling, and addiction treatment to residents.

== Homeless population ==
=== Health issues ===
Hundreds of homeless individuals die each year from diseases, untreated medical conditions, lack of nutrition, and exposure to extreme cold or hot weather. In a mild-wintered San Francisco in 1998, homeless people were purportedly 58% more likely to perish than the general population. In New Orleans, approximately 10,000 homeless were unaccounted for after Hurricane Katrina in 2005. Residents of homeless shelters may also be exposed to bed bugs which have been growing more prevalent in countries such as the United States, Canada and in Europe. Some residents of shelters have reported sleeping in roach-infested spaces at various shelters.

Researchers have found that homeless people are at high risk for respiratory tract diseases, such as tuberculosis, peripheral vascular disease, dermatology problems, and infectious diseases, including sexually transmitted diseases. These high rates are attributed to environmental pollution and other risks associated with street life, including trauma, poor nutrition, a lack of access to personal hygiene facilities, and crowding and debilitation, which increase the risk of infectious disease. Besides physical health problems, homeless people are also at great risk of mental health issues resulting from alcohol and drug abuse as a lack of societal concern and care. These issues are also related to public health. Without proper housing, these infectious diseases have a higher rate to affect other people in society.

In Washington, D.C., statistics indicate that 63% of homeless people suffer from a lack of access to regular bathing. Another estimated 58% within the same city are unable to obtain sufficient levels of sleep. Areas such as showers and bathrooms in shelters often have restricted access with limited hours. Homeless individuals also have great trouble finding storage locations for their belongings. Homeless individuals in the United States are subject to being arrested and held in jail for "quality of life" violations or for public intoxication. In Hawaii, homeless people are banned from sitting or lying on the streets.

In 2020, due to the COVID-19 pandemic, homeless shelters were recommended to use a "whole community approach" and to provide sufficient communications relevant to the pandemic.

=== LGBT+ community ===
The LGBT homeless are at increased risk of violence compared to other groups. Transgender people are also at danger of being placed into the incorrect shelters. In some cases, transgender women can be turned away from women's shelters. This can place their safety at risk.

=== Men ===
In a national survey conducted in the United States the findings showed that of the surveyed homeless, two-thirds are men and most likely to be single adults between the ages of 25 and 54.

Young men who have been abused as children are more likely to become homeless and are at risk of becoming chronically homeless if they are not living in a permanent situation by age 24. Poverty has been shown to have a large effect on men's health in general, leading to an extremely unhealthy lifestyle. Some of the challenges include low self-esteem, weakening, mental strain and poor physical health. Although women tend to have higher poverty rates, men still experience the same negative effects.

=== Women ===
Women can experience homelessness and poverty because they are most likely to bear child-rearing responsibilities and vulnerable to become victims of family members or intimate partners.

Homeless women, both those with children and without, experience higher rates of physical illness than men. They are also more likely to be hyper-vigilant and have high levels of stress. Women seeking refuge from domestic violence are not always able to find rooms in shelters. Some women have been turned away from homeless shelters because shelter staff believe that turning women away will stop people from having sex inside the shelter.

Homeless women who are of childbearing age also face unique hygiene issues because of menstruation. Homeless shelters have noted that both tampons and sanitary pads "top the list of needs at shelters" because of their high cost and because they are not donated often.

== Alternative models and management philosophies ==
=== Housing first practice ===
The homeless shelters across the United States act merely as emergency shelter systems that can only hold a fraction of the rapidly increasing homeless population. The Housing First practice provides an alternative to the current network of homeless shelters. The program targets the large problem within the United States which is a lack of affordable housing. This methodology attempts to place homeless families back into independent living situations as quickly as possible. The Housing First practice has achieved success because homeless families are more responsive to social services support when they are in their own housing. It provides crisis intervention, affordable rental housing, and gives each family a grace period of six months to a year of social service to allow the family to get back on their feet. The effectiveness of this concept is that it assists homeless families in identifying their needs and recognizing the choices they must make. From this point families can create better options for themselves and plan strategies for living on their own.

=== Religious shelters ===
Homeless shelters are often affiliated with the charitable efforts of religious organizations. Religious shelters may require attendance at a prayer service in order to receive services. The Salvation Army is a social support service organization that also functions as a religious group.

=== Vehicles as shelter ===
Around the late 2000s, in Santa Barbara and other areas in California, groups of recently homeless began to camp out in their cars in parking lots with the coordinated support of a local non-profit group. These individuals and families were often unable to afford rent or mortgage, but still had jobs, cars, insurance and other types of support structures. In Santa Barbara, an estimated 55 individuals camped out every night in various private and public lots, some reserved for women only. As more people began to camp in their vehicles, California cities began to pass laws against sleeping in vehicles, like the 2013 ordinance passed in Palo Alto. However, many of these laws in different municipalities were later struck down in higher courts as unconstitutional, like the Los Angeles ban which was judged by the 9th Circuit Court of Appeals in 2014. Some cities chose to repeal their own bans on sleeping in vehicles. In Los Angeles in 2015, approximately 9,500 homeless have turned their cars into homes. In Hawaii, a Honolulu-based company is retrofitting five retired city buses into mobile shelters which provide a place to sleep and get a shower.

== Community attitudes ==
Community attitude towards homeless shelters varies widely, but one study found that older people, men, homeowners and all people making larger incomes were often averse to the concept of homeless shelters in general. Calgary neighborhoods recognize the need for shelters, but many do not want to situate a shelter near their own homes. A similar response came from residents in Oahu. In communities such as Portland, Oregon, where weather can be harsh and municipal politics tend to be highly liberal, there is high grassroots support for shelters. At the opposite end of the spectrum, jurisdictions such as Santa Barbara, California feature ongoing disputes in an often highly adversarial mode. Disputes have occasionally escalated to such schemes as re-arranging benches on city sidewalks to discourage panhandlers. In another 2011 incident, an eight unit supportive housing project which had been approved was called back onto city council agenda the following week in order to allow approximately 35 public comments pro and con, despite the fact that the measure had just been approved.

There have at times been concerns raised about the transmission of diseases in the homeless population housed in shelters, although public health professionals contend that such concerns are inflated. In addition, a study published in 2014 conducted in Marseille, France found that respiratory illnesses in homeless shelters were not significantly different from the general population. In addition, during the peak influenza months, the shelter occupants did not test positive for the flu virus and the researchers hypothesize that being isolated from others may have been the reason they were virus-free. However, outbreaks of tuberculosis have been reported occurring in shelters within three large Ohio cities in the 1990s.

A question has been raised as just how much money donated to the charities that run the shelters actually gets to the homeless people and the required services. In many cases, there is a large overhead in administrative costs, which compromise the money for their homeless clients.

=== Internal problems in homeless shelters ===
Corruption is a major issue among homelessness services providers, as homeless services are frequently contracted to outside organizations or neglected by municipal governments. Shelter residents can be victims of violence, abuse, and theft at the hands of their fellow residents or employees of the shelter.

Shelters can become dangerously overcrowded when too many occupants are allowed entry to the shelter.

Shelters sometimes are unable to meet state standards for occupancy, such as testing fire sprinklers or ensuring that exits are clearly marked. In New York City, 2015, the state withheld funding from many shelters which did not meet standards or which had poor conditions.

Shelter employees are sometimes at risk from violence perpetrated by the residents they are serving. In order to address problems faced by employees who are trying to help homeless people in New York, the Department of Homeless Services increased security at some shelters and conducted security assessments of shelters in 2015. While many employees of shelters know that there is a risk when working in high-crime neighborhoods or with individuals who are mentally ill, they continue to work at homeless shelters because they feel that they are performing a public service akin to the police or firefighters.

=== External problems ===
Residents of neighborhoods which host homeless shelters frequently express concerns that homeless shelters have a negative effect on surrounding communities. As homeless shelters attract homeless people, problems may include panhandling, the erection of improvised accommodations (such as tents) in nearby spaces, increased crime, and the introduction of drugs or alcohol in communities. The placement of a homeless shelter in a community can decrease property values, drive down business activity, and cause non-homeless residents fear.

Communities in the U.S. have sought to prevent the building of homeless shelters through zoning regulations and other legal or regulatory measures. If a shelter is already in place, authorities have sought to increase penalties for the aforementioned issues or disincentivize the assembly of homeless people through methods such as hostile architecture.

Advocates for homeless shelters respond that most homeless shelters prohibit illegal drugs and alcohol (although enforcement varies), and that claimed effects in property values, safety, or business are less drastic than claimed or merely a matter of perception.

== Countries ==
=== Australia ===
In Australia, due to government funding requirements, most homelessness services fill the role of both daytime and night time shelters. Shelters develop empowerment based "wrap around" services in which residents are case managed and supported in their efforts to become self-reliant. An example of such a service provider in this area in Australia is Najidah.

Youth refuges in Australia provide both a residential setting for crisis accommodation as well as case management to assist young people to live independently. Youth refuges are a relatively new form of homeless shelters. In New South Wales the early refuges include Caretakers Cottage, Young People's Refuge, Taldamunde Youth Services, all founded in the mid-1970s.

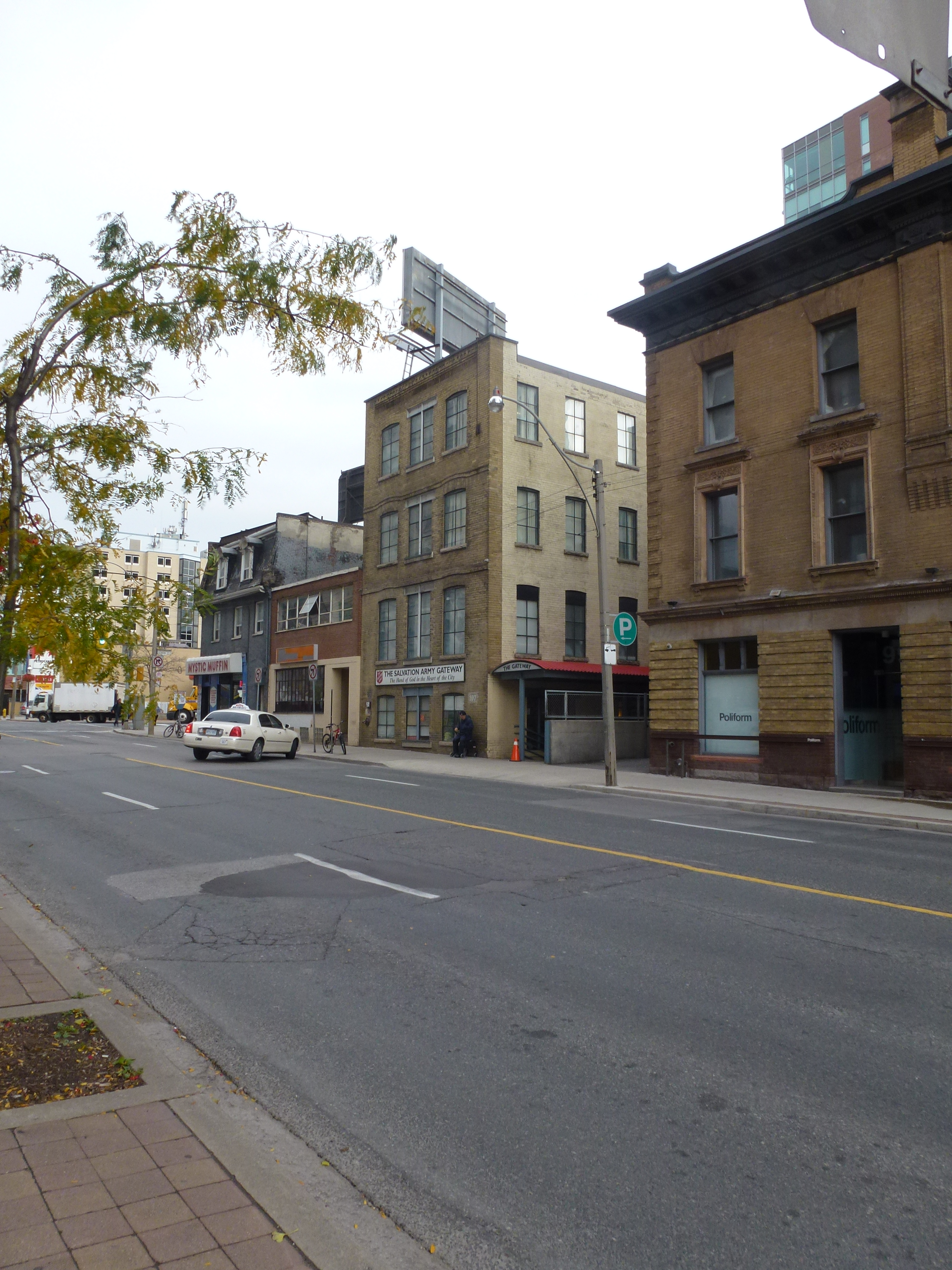
The Gateway, a Salvation Army homeless shelter in Toronto

=== Canada ===
Canada has an estimated homeless population somewhere between 150,000 and 300,000 people as reported in 2014. Canada has responded to an increase in homelessness by increasing the amount of shelter space available to individuals. A study done in

Canada also found that individuals entering shelters and drop-in centers experienced a loss of their own sense of personhood. Therapeutic Conversation therapy has been tested and found successful in Calgary with a small group of homeless shelter residents in improving their mental health outcomes. Calgary has seen an increase in the amount of homelessness, partly due to the "lack of affordable rental units".

A nationwide volunteer group in Canada, the Angels in the Night, sponsored by Invis-Mortgage Intelligence, donates cold-weather clothes and other supplies to homeless people, visiting shelters and individuals on the streets.

In 2015, Clean the World began a Canadian Operations Center in Montreal order to supply soap for homeless shelters. Clean the World distributes and recycles hygiene supplies such as soap and shampoo.

=== China ===
In China, homeless estimates vary, since the Social Welfare Department does not consider those living in temporary shelters to be "homeless". There may be approximately 1 to 1.5 million homeless children who have left their families because of extreme poverty, family issues or abuse.

Homelessness in China is mainly attributed to natural disasters, migration, and discrimination. It is not uncommon for natural disasters in China to displace many people from their homes. Unlike other countries, China has an extremely high amount of homeless children. Children make up nearly one million of those experiencing homelessness in China. It is estimated that about half of these children are runaways, who are hoping to escape abusive or impoverished homes. During the COVID-19 pandemic, the number of homeless people has been increasing, and this is a cost of China's zero-covid policy. Because of the strict lockdown policy in China, people are restricted from leaving or going back to their residences. A lot of essential workers like delivery men are forced to become "homeless" because they cannot go back to their apartments or houses as they have a greater risk of spreading the virus. In Shanghai during the pandemic, nearly 20,000 delivery riders are facing a lack of shelter and safety.

In the city of Dali, there is an annual conference for "beggars." In 2014, a government-sponsored shelter in Henan province which houses 20 homeless individuals was under scrutiny for tying children to trees and providing inadequate sleeping areas.

=== India ===
India defines homelessness as not being in residence of a "census house" which must constitute a structure with a roof.

In India, youth can become homeless because of child abandonment. Youth in Jammu and Kashmir who live in shelters reported high prevalence of emotional and physical abuse, and emotional and physical neglect while living in homeless shelters.

Homeless individuals and families in India face challenges accessing water and hygiene services. A 2011 Census of India found that safe drinking water coverage in urban areas is at 91.9% while regular sanitation access is at 81.4%. There is a significant lack of housing in major urban areas in India. People come from the rural part of India to look for work and when there are no accommodations for housing build their own shelters, often known as "hutments".

==== Statistics of homeless population within India ====
According to the 2011 Census, there were 1.77 million homeless people in India, or 0.15% of the country's total population. In India, the cities with the greatest number of homeless individuals and families are Greater Mumbai, Delhi, Kolkata, Chennai, and Bangalore.

=== Iran ===
Tehran municipality has three shelters and one female shelter in district 2 a total room of 4000. There are two active shelters in Qazvin, Sanandaj, and Zahedan. Isfahan has a shelter with 5000 beds. They are mostly run by charities or NGOs. Homeless people are often allowed to use them from one to two days. Homeless trans people aren't allowed in these shelters.

=== Japan ===
The number of homeless individuals in Japan as recorded in 2003, was around 25,296. Numbers of those without homes have been "increasing dramatically" since the "bubble economy" collapsed in the 1990s. In Tokyo, around 2007, many homeless individuals were cleared out of their temporary residences in city parks. In 2011, the earthquake and tsunami left many individuals homeless and living in shelters.

=== United Kingdom ===
"Sleeping rough" or "rough sleeping" is terminology in the United Kingdom for sleeping without shelter. In addition, "not all homeless people are entitled to housing." Shelters like 'Jimmy's', in Cambridge, provide access to those who would otherwise be "sleeping rough", offering temporary accommodation and support services in the basement of a Baptist church in the city centre. Homeless shelters in Britain tend to be accommodation on a night by night basis. Homeless hostels tend to offer ongoing accommodation for a period, aiming towards resettlement into settled or more suitable accommodation. The Centre for Homelessness Impact carried out the largest ever survey of UK hostels and summarised their key characteristics.

=== United States ===
In the United States, the "shelter movement" began to grow significantly during the 1970s when there was a high rate of unemployment, housing costs were rising and individuals with severe mental illnesses were being deinstitutionalized. In the 1980s, homelessness was becoming a "national epidemic" in the United States and helping professionals created shelters as "temporary havens". Shelter occupation had more than doubled by the late 1980s and it doubled again by 2000. Statistics from 2011 show that "on a given night in January 2010, 407,966 individuals were housed inside homeless shelters, transitional housing or on the streets.

Homeless shelters need to provide a variety of services to diverse residents. Homeless shelters, like La Posada Providencia in San Benito, Texas, may also house asylum seekers, mainly from Mexico, Central America and South America. Shelters also provide outreach to residents who are unable to use a shelter or who choose not to use a shelter.

Most shelters typically expect residents to exit in the morning and occupy themselves elsewhere during the day, returning for an evening meal and to sleep. During times of inclement weather, shelters may provide services outside of their normal hours.

In the United States, the Department of Housing and Urban Development (HUD) has shown in recent studies that about 5 million Americans qualify to use homeless shelters.The number of homeless shelters, in particular in the United States, has continued to rise into the 2020s. Based on a survey of 24 U.S. cities the average stay in a homeless shelter was found to be on average about seven months out of the year.

Homeless encampments have become commonplace in US cities, particularly in cities with highly visible homeless populations – most notably Seattle and San Francisco. These efforts can result from a combination of complaints by wealthier (usually newer) residents and anti-homeless political actions originating from local mayors and legislators.

==== Statistics of homeless population within the United States ====
A study by the National Law Center on Homelessness and Poverty estimates that 2.3 to 3.5 million Americans experience homelessness annually. Alaska, California, Nevada, Oregon, Colorado, and Hawaii are the states with the highest concentration of homeless people. Around 1.5 million children or one of out every 50 children in America are homeless. Many Americans suffer from the state of "chronic homelessness", which is where an individual has a disabling condition who has been continuously homeless for over a year or has been homeless on at least four different instances within four years. About 23% of the homeless population has been tagged as "chronic homeless". Veterans also represent close to 40% of homeless men within the United States. Racial demographics of the homeless population of the United States can be represented as:

- Whites: 39%
- African-Americans: 42%
- Hispanics: 13%
- Native Americans: 4%
- Asians: 2%

Approximately 40% of all homeless youth in the United States identify as LGBT (Lesbian, Gay, Bisexual, Transgender). In San Francisco, approximately 29% of all homeless people in that city are on the LGBT spectrum. The National Center for Transgender Equality reports that 1 in 5 transgender individuals has experienced being homeless at least once in their lives.

Pet ownership among homeless people varies, but estimates indicate that about 5 and 10 percent of homeless people in the United States have a pet.

Homelessness appears to be largely concentrated within urban areas. Central cities hold 71% of the homeless population while the suburbs have 21% of the homeless population. Only 9% of homeless people are located within rural areas.

==== Operations and role in U.S. society ====
Shelters which are funded by the United States Department of Housing and Urban Development (HUD) require residents to have identification.

==== List of national organizations in the U.S supporting homeless shelters ====
Across the United States there are several national organizations that assist in the founding and the upkeep of homeless shelters. The main national organizations are:

- National Alliance to End Homelessness
- The Salvation Army
- The Department of Veterans Affairs
- Covenant House
- Feeding America

==== United States libraries ====
Homeless shelters often work with other organizations in order to support and help homeless people improve their situations, including libraries. They often work with the coalition to grant a temporary library card for homeless coalition members who can use a shelter as a local address. This is intended to give new patrons the opportunity to utilize the computer services, books, programs, and more that the library offers.

==== Government assistance programs in the United States ====
HUD estimates that it costs $60,000 each year to house a homeless family in a shelter. Because of this, HUD has various programs in place to help families, including rapid rehousing and permanent housing vouchers. Housing vouchers from HUD are considered especially important for helping to prevent families with children from becoming homeless and also to help these families be able to leave the shelter system permanently.

== See also ==
- Civil defense
- Cooling center
- Emergency management
- Extreme poverty
- Food bank
- Four penny coffin
- Homelessness
- Human rights
- Penny sit-up
- Refugee camp
- Right to housing
- Social programs
- Soup kitchen
- Warming center
