= Points of Invincibility =

Shelters in Ukraine with power for wartime blackouts

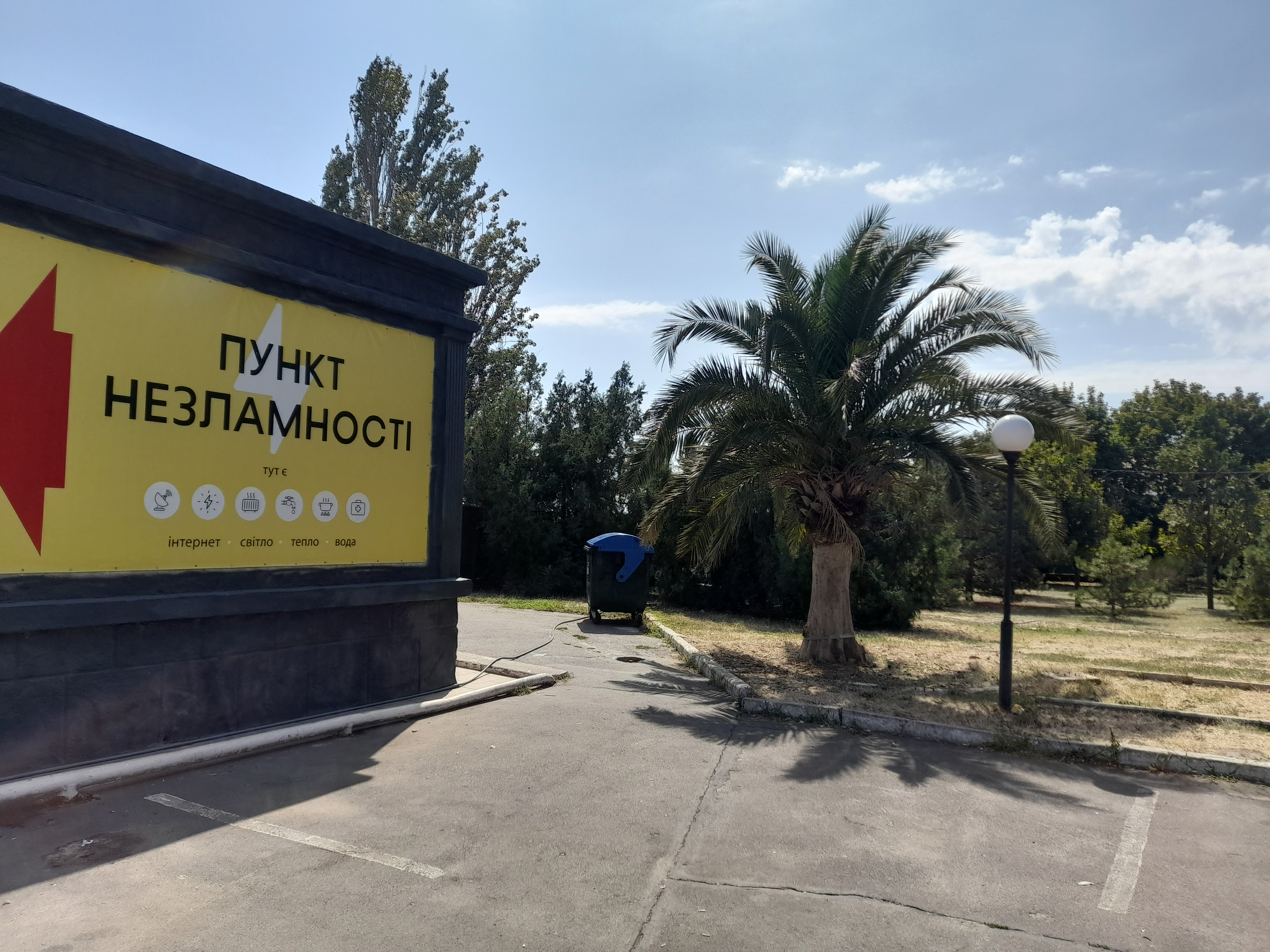
A sign leading to a Point of Invincibility in Odesa Oblast

"Points of Invincibility" (Ukrainian: «Пункт незламності», romanized: "Punkt nezlamnosti") are emergency shelters in Ukraine that provide heat, water, electricity, mobile communication, and other services to residents during wartime blackouts. This project was initiated by the Ukrainian government in November 2022 following massive shelling of critical infrastructure by Russia after Russia's 2022 full-scale invasion of Ukraine.

== History ==
=== Background ===
Massive Russian strikes on critical infrastructure have disrupted electricity, water, heat, and communication in many cities of Ukraine. Points of Invincibility provide facilities such as heat, water, electricity, mobile communication, internet, places for rest, first aid kits, and provisions for mothers and children.

In late October 2022, the Office of the President of Ukraine began working on the deployment of warming centres in case of power outages. Initially, a network of 17,000 warming centres was planned. However, about a week before the 23 November rocket attacks, the authorities decided to mark only the 4,800 locations equipped with generators on the map as Points of Invincibility.

=== Network deployment ===
According to then-Deputy Head of the Office of the President Kyrylo Tymoshenko, the Cabinet of Ministers officially adopted the decision on the "Points of Invincibility" under the label "secret". In mid-November 2022, online meetings of high-ranking officials with local authorities regarding the deployment of the network began. The first Points of Invincibility began operating on Svobody Square in Kherson on November 18, 2022, a week after the city was liberated from Russian occupation.

On November 22, 2022, Ukrainian President Volodymyr Zelenskyy announced the deployment of the project throughout Ukraine. Zelenskyy announced that the points would operate in all regional and district administrations (controlled by Ukraine), and at schools, buildings of the State Emergency Service, and other locations. Each Point of Invincibility can accommodate between 40 and 500 people; there is no time limit on a person's stay there. The Kyiv Regional Military Administration said that the staffing and operation of the points is done "taking into account the available resources of executive authorities and local self-government bodies". The initiative was joined by businesses, such as food establishments, which set up Points of Invincibility. By November 24, 2022, more than 4,300 Points of Invincibility were operating in Ukraine.

United Nations representatives visited Points of Invincibility in Kherson, and the ambassadors of the G7 countries visited a Point of Invincibility in Kyiv. Then-Minister of Internal Affairs Denys Monastyrskyi said deploying one fully equipped point cost at least 17,000 euros.

On 19 January 2026, Ukrainian Prime Minister Yulia Svyrydenko said that 10,676 Points of Invincibility were operating in Ukraine, and 130,000 people had used them since the beginning of the year. She announced plans to further improve the network, such as by deploying points that could operate continuously for longer and would be better-equipped.

=== Outside Ukraine ===
After the 2026 arson attack on the Berlin power grid led to a multi-day power outage, Ukrainian refugees in Berlin set up a "Point of Invincibility" for locals, as a gesture of gratitude and to share their experience dealing with blackouts.

== See also ==
- Russian strikes against Ukrainian infrastructure
- Warming center
