= Grant Woods =

Grant Woods may refer to:

- Grant Woods (attorney), American attorney and politician who served as Attorney General of Arizona from 1991 until 1999
- Grant Woods (biologist), American biologist specializing in white tail deer and associated land management

== See also ==
- Grant Wood, American artist
