= Human-elephant conflict in Kerala =

Human-elephant conflict (HEC) is a serious threat to wild elephants and humans in some rural forest and forest border areas of Kerala, India. Every year more than 100 wild elephants die in Kerala of various causes, including HEC cases of electrocution, poaching, firecrackers, poisoning, and train hits, while about 20 people are killed and more injured.

Estimates of the number of wild elephants in Kerala vary, with the Kerala Forest and Wildlife Department estimating that there were just under 1,800 wild elephants in the state in 2024. Prior estimates (using different estimation techniques) include 4,286 wild elephants according to a 1993 census, and 5,706 according to a 2017 census. There appears to be some confusion as to which estimates are most reliable, with factors such as elephant migration patterns to nearby states potentially affecting wild elephant counts.

== Background ==
Kerala has a vast forest area of 11,309 km^{2} (4,366 sq mi), which covers more than 29.1% of the total geographical area of the state. Human–wildlife conflict (due to various species) is common on the fringes of forested areas. Due to the significant increase in human population and development, which brings increasing anthropogenic pressure on the forest areas, human-wildlife interaction and conflict have increased in recent times. The conflicts have resulted in damage to crops, houses and property, cattle being carried away, and deaths and injuries to humans. More than 50 wild elephant attacks were reported in the state in the financial year 2024–25, and the number of deaths due to wild elephant attacks in the state has increased.

== Activism ==
Activists such as Rajeev Kurup of the Kerala Elephant Foundation have worked extensively to raise awareness of the plight of elephants in Kerala and southern India, including wild elephant injuries and deaths arising from HEC or other causes. The related project Kerala Suffering Elephants documents many such incidents for the sake of improving conditions and outcomes for elephants in Kerala and India.

== Incidents in 2025 ==
=== Human HEC deaths in Kerala in 2025 ===
- January 2025 — One person died and 17 people were injured in an elephant attack during the Puthiyangadi festival in Tirur, Malappuram district.
- 16 January 2025 — A 52-year-old woman from the Kattunayakan tribal community was killed in an attack by a wild elephant in Nilambur.
- February 2025 — A young man died in a wild elephant attack at Meppadi in Wayanad
- 6 February 2025 — A 60-year-old man died after being attacked by a wild elephant in Idukki district.
- 13 February 2025 — Three people were killed in an elephant attack during the annual festival at the Manakulangara temple in Kuruvangad near Koyilandy.
- 24 February 2025 — An elderly couple died in a wild elephant attack in Kannur 13th block.

== Protests ==
Some locals and various political and cultural organizations are continuing their protests against the lack of a solution to the elephant attacks in Kerala near areas where elephant attacks have happened.

On 24 February 2025, protesters and villagers in Aralam blocked an ambulance carrying the bodies of a couple killed in a wild elephant attack. The protesters refused to let the ambulance through until Kerala Forest Minister A. K. Saseendran arrived.

== Elephants in Kerala ==
Along with a considerable population of wild elephants, Kerala has about 400 captive elephants, down from more than 500 in 2018. Most captive elephants in Kerala are owned by temples and individuals, with some owned by the local forest department. Elephants are owned and maintained predominantly for their use in festivals and ceremonies, but some are also involved in timber logging.

== See also ==
- Elephants in Kerala culture
- Human–wildlife conflict
