= Human–lion conflict =

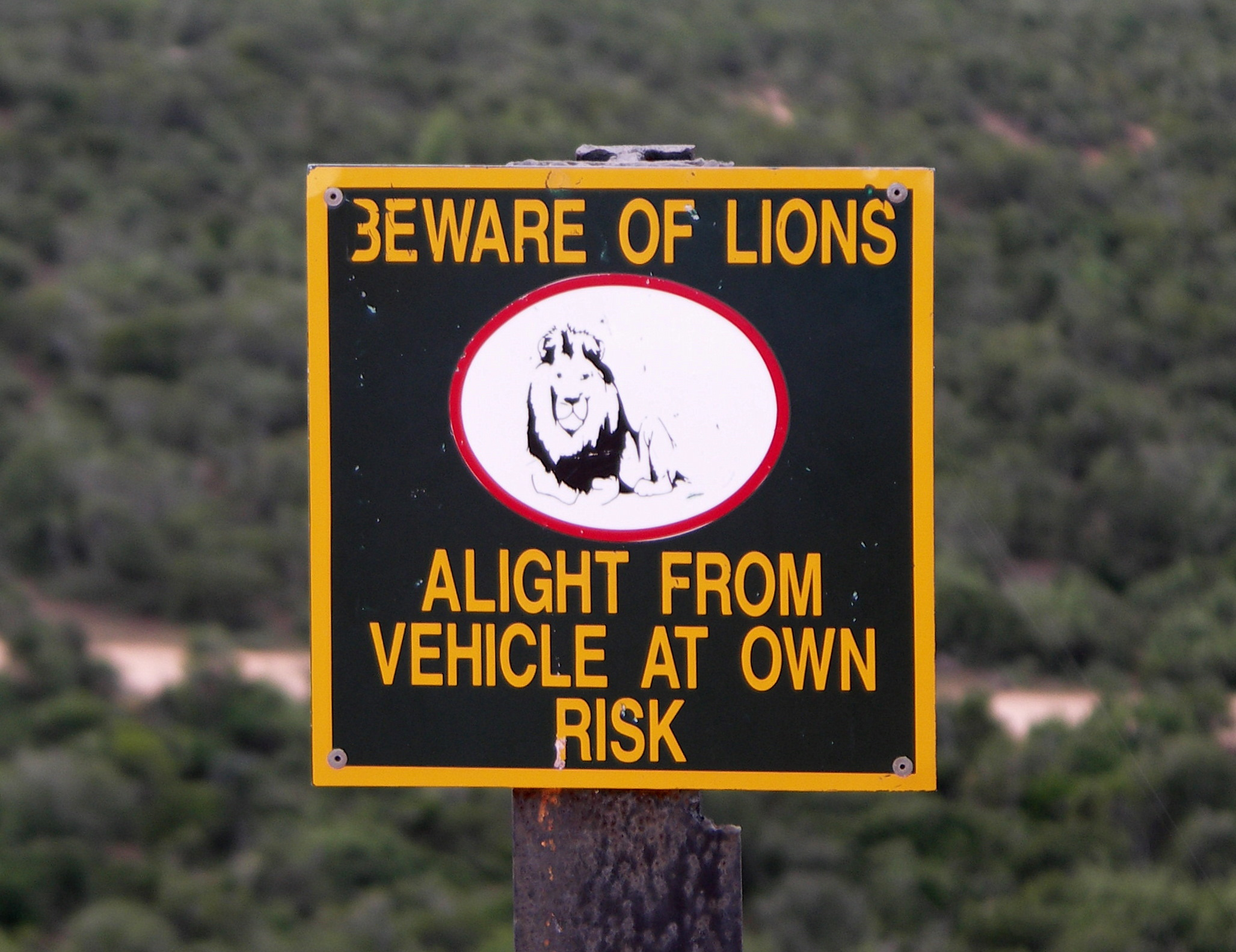
Signage in Addo Elephant National Park reminding people of the possible threat lions pose.

Human–lion conflict refers to the pattern of problematic interactions between native humans and lions. Conflict with humans is a major contributor of the decline in lion populations in Africa. Habitat loss and fragmentation due to conversion of land for agriculture has forced lions to live in closer proximity to human settlements. As a result, conflict is often characterized by lions preying upon livestock, known as livestock depredation. When depredation events take place, farmers suffer financial losses and lions face threats of retaliatory killing.

== Causes of conflict ==
The main cause of conflict is habitat loss. 83% of the African lion's range has been reduced and what remains is increasingly fragmented. Lions, as large carnivores, rely on large connected expanses of land. The conversion of their habitat into agricultural land prevents them from dispersing and can limit the availability of natural prey. Lions are therefore roaming closer to farms than before and are at a higher risk of preying on livestock.

=== Ecological variables ===
There are many ecological variables that can affect likelihood of depredation. Factors such as farms' distance from water sources, protected areas, elevation and surrounding vegetative cover may all play a role. Some research has shown that depredation decreases with distance from protected areas. This could be because access to nearby conservation areas provides lions with a refuge when coming into contact with humans. Farms that are located close to water sources and at a low elevation may be especially vulnerable to conflict. The effect of vegetative cover remains unclear. Dense vegetative cover has been associated with a higher rate of depredation yet has also been shown to reduce depredation as it allows predators to hide from humans. Farm and livestock management can also affect chances of depredation. Corralling livestock at night as well as providing guards to monitor lion movements to prevent and deter predation can limit losses.

== Financial losses ==
Depredation events lead to financial losses to farmers who rely on livestock as a source of income. In the North West province of South Africa, around $375, 797USD were lost as a result of game and livestock losses caused by depredation. Lions are not the only predators involved, with hyenas, leopards, and wild dogs responsible for depredation events as well. However, lions typically attack cattle which incur higher financial losses than sheep and goats (hunted by hyenas and leopards).

=== Compensation ===
In order to lessen these financial losses, some regions offer financial compensation to affected farmers. However, these programs are not always effective. Major criticisms revolve around the response times of programs, arguing that they take too long or do not happen at all. Additionally, farmers do not always receive sufficient financial restitution. For example, as of 2009, Botswana's state-funded compensation program only compensated farmers for 80% of the value they lost. It is common for farmers to not even report livestock losses due in part to dissatisfaction with response time and amount. However, the Predator Compensation Fund (PCF) in Massailand, Kenya has reduced retaliatory killings following depredation events by 73%, illustrating that when done correctly, compensation programs can be effective. Farmers who have received compensation have also reported a lower likelihood of killing a suspected lion than those who have not received any. Regardless of their efficacy, compensation programs are reactionary and not preventative, only seeking to mitigate farmers' losses after the event and do not address underlying causes of conflict

== Retaliatory killing ==
Retaliatory killing is the hunting of a suspected predator after a depredation event. While a threat for all predators, lions are killed disproportionately to the number of losses they are responsible for as opposed to hyenas and leopards. One reason lions are killed in retaliation more than other carnivores is because of their propensity to kill cattle more than sheep and goats. Because cattle are of more financial value to farmers than sheep and goats, the desire to retaliate can be greater. Lions also will hunt during the night when most attacks take place, are easier to track, and are more likely to defend a carcass which make them more vulnerable to being killed by humans

=== Likelihood of retaliation ===
Social and economic differences also impact motivation to hunt lions in reaction to livestock losses. People who have lost a higher proportion of their livestock to depredation (often those with smaller farms to begin with) as well as those owning livestock for the purpose of sale as opposed to traditional or subsistence reasons have been found to report a higher willingness to retaliate. Both higher proportional losses and keeping livestock for sale increase the value of cattle and therefore increase the financial incentive to kill suspected predators. Likelihood to retaliate has also been shown to be influenced by social factors such as religion and culture

== Reducing conflict ==
Due to the complex social, economic, and ecological aspects of human-lion conflict, it is recommended that mitigation strategies be adaptable and situation-specific. Specific actions such as providing guards to monitor predators and protect cattle, corralling livestock at night, providing compensation and restoring natural prey densities may reduce conflict in some areas. Focusing on unique conservation programs that take into account factors such as culture and religion, type of livestock owned, and reason for owning livestock may also be helpful.

== See also ==
- Human–wildlife conflict
- Lion lights
