= Warming center =

Type of emergency shelter

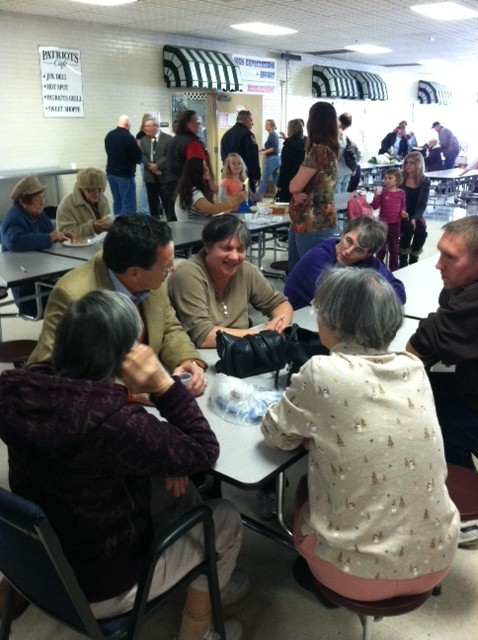
Visitors to a warming center

A warming center (also a heat bank or warm bank) is a short-term emergency shelter that operates when temperatures or a combination of precipitation, wind chill, wind and temperature become dangerously inclement. Their paramount purpose is the prevention of death and injury from exposure to the elements. This may include acute trauma from falling objects such as trees, or injury to extremities due to frostbite. A more prevalent emergency which warming centers seek to prevent is hypothermia, the risk for which is aggravated by factors such as age, alcohol consumption, and homelessness.

== Purpose ==
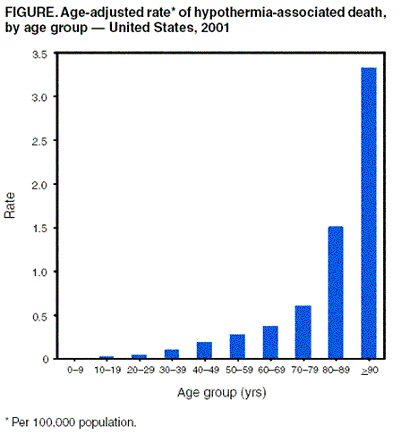
Hypothermia risk factors include age, medical conditions, and homeless status.

Warming centers are frequently meant for persons who are unsheltered due to homelessness and who, for one reason or another, do not utilize existing homeless shelters. In other circumstances, centers serve stranded motorists or, during cold-weather power outages, homeowners and tenants.

In some cases, when cold snaps threaten wildlife, they are created and operated to protect endangered wild animals. Cold-blooded animals such as turtles are particularly vulnerable, as are their hatchlings. Emergency shelters vary in policy on pets, companions, or domesticated animals, although service animals may be admitted even when other animals are prohibited.

== Location of warming centers ==
=== Existing shelters ===
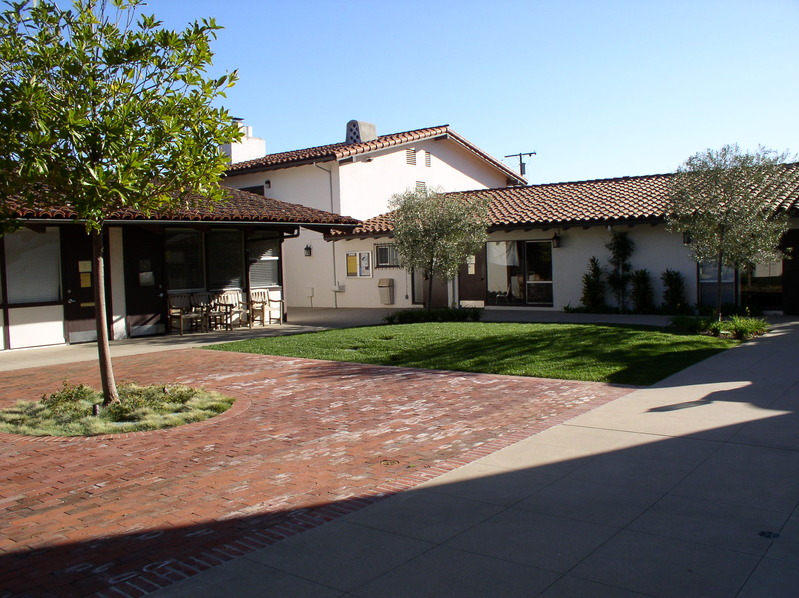
Churches, like this one in the United States, are frequently used as warming centers.

While they are in some cases directly affiliated with existing homeless shelter operations, warming centers are more frequently housed in different locations. Due to zoning, special use permit, and fire code restrictions, homeless shelters and day centers serving homeless populations are often legally constrained from exceeding authorized capacity. Not infrequently, existing shelters are engaged with ongoing negotiations with neighbors who in some cases take a NIMBY (not in my backyard) attitude toward existing operations. Any increase in capacity can become politicized, despite the exigencies of spikes in cold temperature days, particularly when cold or rainy weather is routine.

Thus, they need to secure alternative sites unless restrictions are waived due to extreme or otherwise unusual weather. Such waivers may be either on a one-time basis, or pursuant to memorandum of understanding (MOUs) with relevant agencies; however, existing shelter sites are typically at the highest level of use compatible with neighborhood character and the political balance of power. Few warming center sites appear to be utilizing the same building as routine homeless shelter operations, and the preponderance of them do situate in alternative sites.

=== Alternative sites ===
When not using existing shelters under MOUs or other legal instruments relaxing ordinary legal restrictions, venues of operation frequently involve coalitions of non-profit entities which own or operate suitable real estate. These include churches and community organizations but also may involve special-purpose institutional real estate such as national guard armories.

Some municipalities designate existing public facilities as warming centers during extreme cold weather. Examples include senior centers, public libraries, and police stations.

=== Decision to activate warming centers ===
Warming centers are generally opened for only a few days at a time based on the conditions of the area, although some are open for specific portion of the year when weather conditions are adverse.

The city of Chicago opens its shelters from December 1 to March 1 each year, as well as any other times the temperature drops below freezing.

The city of Portland, Oregon uses a more complex formula to determine when to open shelters; factors include wet or dry conditions, the night's predicted low, the three-day trend of lows, sustained wind speed, and whether snow is on the ground or predicted to fall.

Activation is generally a centralized decision based upon what is termed either an algorithm, or, in other jurisdictions, an activation trigger. Lane County, Oregon utilizes an elaborate system of tiered readiness levels in collaboration with the American Red Cross. They refer to these levels as their "alert status", ranging from fair weather outlook status to standby, watch and finally activate.

== Operations ==
=== Outreach to vulnerable persons ===
Once a center has been sited, staffed and the volunteer phone tree has been activated, it is required to connect with the populations it intends to reach and persuade them to come in. A significant population is resistant to interaction with perceived "authorities" and others may not have sufficient contact with the system of care to be adequately aware of their options. A recent trend promoted by organizations such as Common Ground is to piggyback vulnerability indexes and site data onto HUD-mandated enumeration studies. One of the benefits hoped for with regard to those projects is that there will be better opportunities to promote the warming center option to vulnerable populations.

Centers often coordinate with outside programs. For communication of the availability of open centers, many coordinate with the Federally mandated 2-1-1 or the 3-1-1 phone information system. Street newspapers are generally published weekly or less frequently, which makes them useful only for general information such as contact numbers and locations.

For transportation to centers, some offer free transportation, in some cases for persons being released from jail into conditions of inclement weather. In blizzard conditions, snowmobile enthusiasts have been mobilized.

=== Warming centers in service ===
Once opened and populated, they typically offer only the most bare-bones of service: a cot and perhaps a bowl of hot soup. They are generally operated with one or more experienced professional staff person, due to the difficulties which untrained volunteers might encounter in dealing with the clientele. Often, users of warming centers are persons who are not participating in routine homeless shelter services due to disciplinary exclusions or non-compliance with behavioral policies. In order to distinguish mere oddness from behavioral disorders which might disrupt the ability of other persons to obtain service, professional staff is the preferred alternative to all-volunteer personnel. Others utilizing Warming Centers are persons who are not in the shelter system for an array of reasons not necessarily associated with pathology. They may personally be in transit but not prepared financially or otherwise to contend with unanticipated weather conditions. Others may be locals who are eligible for but decline to stay in shelters due to objections to policies and procedures.

== Historic and current role in society ==
Warming centers frequently are opened as a response to the occurrence of hospitalizations dues to hypothermia when unsheltered persons are discovered in extreme exposure-related trauma or mortality.

They seem to go back as far as 1945, when used in Berlin at the conclusion of World War II. Clothing and blankets were allowed for under the air lift plans and an extensive plan was developed for public "warming centers."

In more recent times, U.S. warming centers are proliferating as a means to serve the unsheltered homeless during temperature and rainfall spikes. Such cohorts may not have access to year-round homeless shelters due to supply and demand imbalance, or may simply be uninterested in nightly access during mild weather, but some observers note that others may be unable to comply with conditions for use. According to Detroit socialist writer Naomi Spencer, they serve also as "a last resort for homeless people to find respite from the cold, especially those with drug addictions, mental illness, or criminal backgrounds, who may not meet requirements imposed by some homeless shelters or religious charity operations." Others, including straight edge, DIY, or anarchist-identified persons who may choose to live "off-the-grid", without facing exclusion from quotidian shelters due to sobriety issues.

Others simply find shelters too regimented, too much like jail: newspaperman Mike Hendricks quotes a former resident of an unauthorized homeless encampment named Crow, who said that "some guys would sooner do what they want and not be told what to do."

Tom Brown's Field Guide to City and Suburban Survival contains chapters on shelters and heating. He also outlines means of creating a personal warming center by using ATM access cards. His recommendations have been circulated by Chicago's urban community activist Chrisdian Wittenburg including instructions on building a makeshift stove and a plethora of collaborative cultural projects.

== Controversy ==
Perception of the importance and priority of warming centers varies. At one extreme, their under-utilization or minimal level of service is characterized as unfriendly. During the blizzard of February 2011, the City of Ottawa, Illinois did not have established warming centers, and an ad hoc facility was established. Users were required to bring their own food and blankets, drawing fire for the "have-nots...can all freeze to death...here in the friendly city." In Detroit, failure to disburse Community Development Block Grants resulted in a situation where people slept in plastic chairs or "in cold hallways".

At the other end of the continuum, critics have expressed skepticism that the churches and other facilities utilized for warming centers are appropriate and capable of handling the clientele. Another contention is that assisting homeless people "enables" them to continue a lifestyle which is problematic.

But advocates of warming centers have similarly noted that they tend to maintain the status quo by not addressing structural factors, but their emphasis is that too little rather than too much is done to help the needy. Sue Murphy is the administrative director of Interfaith Action of Evanston, Illinois, which has a daytime center for a time slot during which overnight shelters are closed to clients. She states that warmth and snacks "is not nearly enough...what we need is a place where they can go the whole winter". Her concerns are seconded by Sue Loellebach of Connections for the Homeless, who laments the paucity of warm refuge during daylight hours, but rejects that and even extended-stay shelters as inadequate and that they perpetuate the status quo.

== See also ==
- Cooling center
- Points of Invincibility
