= Cooling center =

Air-conditioned space for protection from hot weather

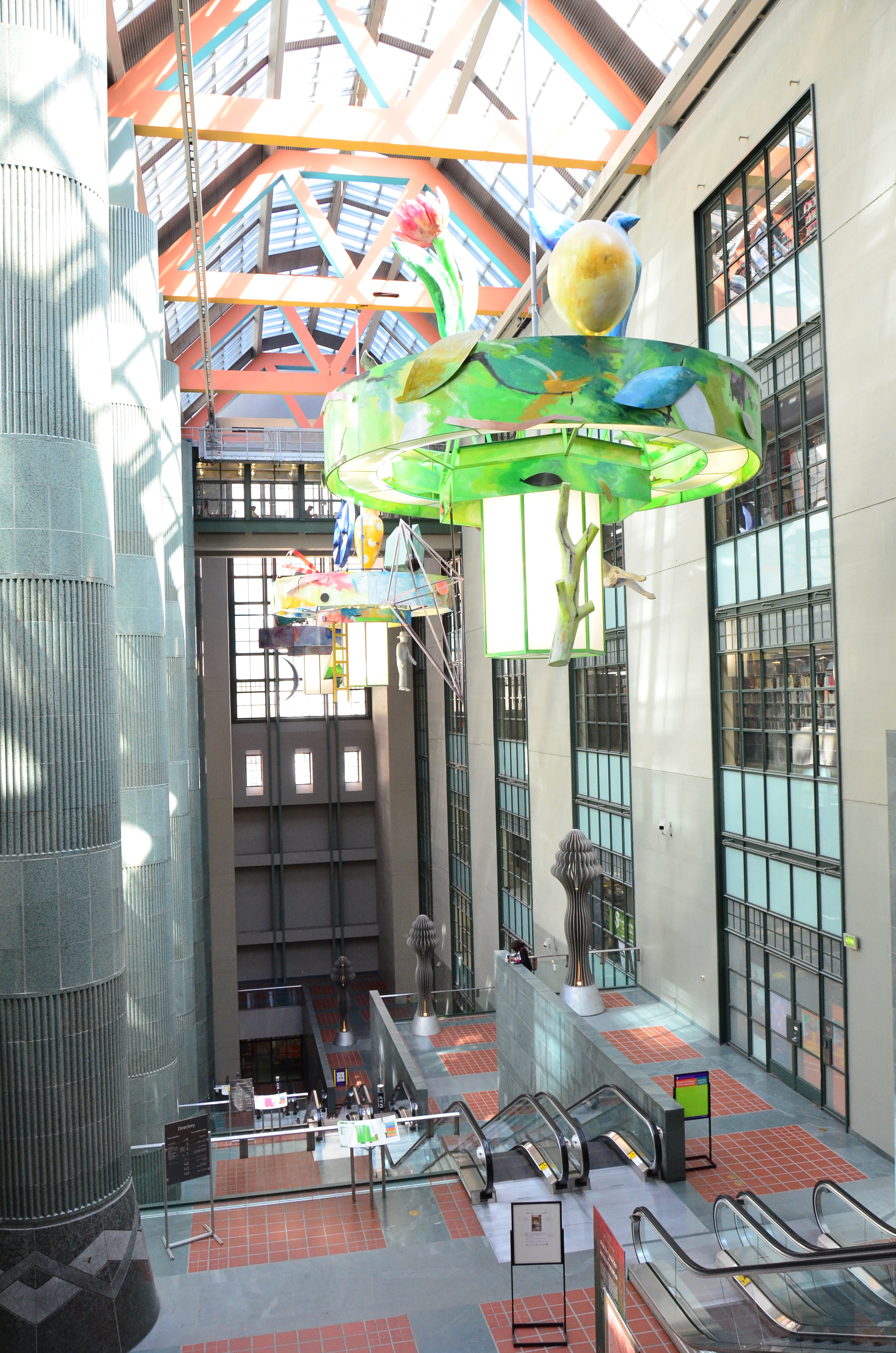
Los Angeles Central Library, a designated cooling center

A cooling center is an air-conditioned public or private space to temporarily deal with the adverse health effects of extreme heat weather conditions such as heat waves. Cooling centers are one of the possible mitigation strategies to prevent hyperthermia caused by heat, humidity, and poor air quality.

As the danger of heat waves has risen in the public consciousness, cooling centers are increasingly used in larger cities such as Los Angeles, New York City, Chicago, Boston, and Toronto, as well as less urban population areas. Cooling centers may also be used in places like Portland and Seattle, where home air conditioning is rare but summer can bring temperatures exceeding 90 °F (32 °C) for several days. Similarly, during the 2018 heat wave and fires that reached northern Scandinavia, a supermarket in Finland was temporarily used as a cooling center.

As various studies have projected more intense, more frequent, and longer-lasting heat waves in the future, some connected to climate change, many state and federal governments in the US would be including cooling centers as part of their heat adaptation strategy and warning system.

== Organization and ownership ==
=== Formal ===
In general, formal or official cooling centers are implemented and operated by a variety of local actors such as municipalities, fire departments, county agencies, and non-profit organizations. They are usually sited at multiple locations throughout a municipality, such as public libraries, community centers, senior centers, and police stations. Another health measure sometimes taken during heat waves is to extend operational hours at public beaches and swimming pools. Some cities, particularly Barcelona, Spain, have instated a network of climate shelters, which are broader forms of cooling shelters that aim to provide refuge from extreme weather events as the effects of climate change worsen.

Cooling centers provide shade, water, and restrooms; medical attention and referrals to social services may also be offered. Their services are aimed at the homeless, those without access to adequate air conditioning, and at-risk populations such as the elderly, children and those with mental disabilities or chronic medical conditions.

=== Informal ===
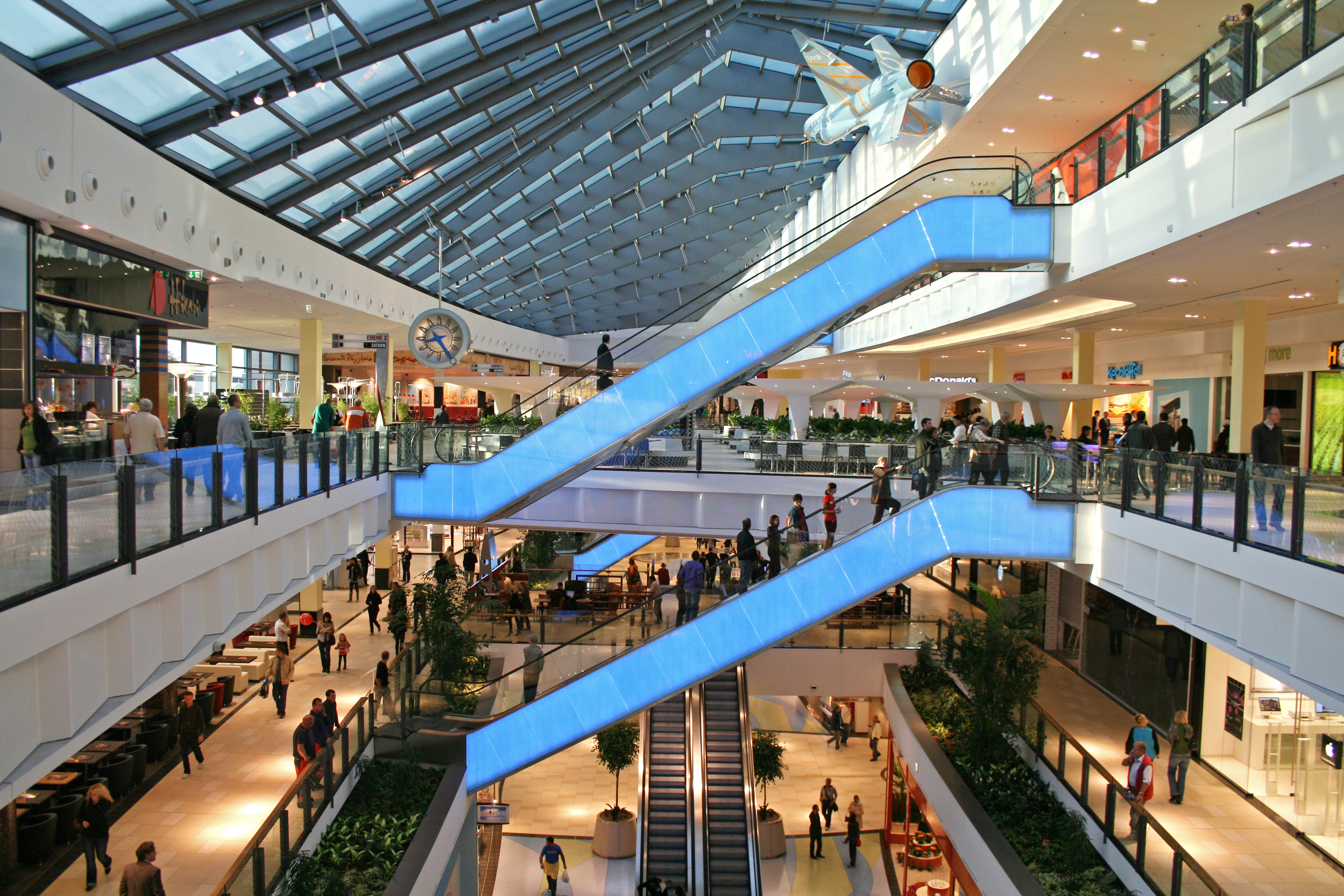
Shopping malls have been used as informal cooling centers by people during extreme heat events.

Informal cooling centers are places such as shopping malls, markets, pools, recreation centers, temples, museums, or businesses that people use during extreme heat. A University of California, Los Angeles study published online in January 2023 in the journal Applied Geography analyzed smartphone data to examine how formal and informal cooling centers were being used in Los Angeles County. Researchers found that, overall, about 20% of the population used cooling centers. Of the population that used cooling centers, 90% used 610 shopping malls and other informal cooling centers in the study rather than county cooling centers (10%).

== See also ==
- Warming center
- Community centre
