= Human-elephant conflict in Sri Lanka =

Human-elephant conflict (HEC) is a large threat to both species in certain rural areas of Sri Lanka. About 250 elephants and 80 people die each year, and property is also destroyed. In 2020, the Department of Wildlife Conservation (Sri Lanka) estimated that there were 7,000 elephants in the country. The department's official records show that more than 361 elephants were killed in 2019. Sri Lanka has the highest number of elephant kills of any country in the world.

== Sri Lankan elephant ==
The Sri Lankan elephant (Elephas maximus maximus) is a subspecies of the Asian elephant, native to Sri Lanka. It has been listed as an endangered species since 1986. This subspecies is smaller than the African elephant, but typically larger than the Asian elephant: it can grow to 2 to 3.5 meters in height and 4 to 6 metres in length. It is tallest at the arch of the back. It weighs between 3,000 and 5,000 kilograms. Only the males have tusks, and these are smaller than those of the African elephant.

== Background ==
Fragmentation and loss of the natural habitat of elephants are considered to be the main causes of HEC in Sri Lanka. The Department of Wildlife Conservation (Sri Lanka) observes that human-elephant conflict is a serious problem, particularly in unprotected areas of the North-western and Mahaweli regions in the country.

Several studies have shown that poaching has helped reduce elephant populations by up to 75 percent over the last century. But the main causes of the reduction are the increased use of the land for agriculture and the expansion of human settlements.

Deforestation in Sri Lanka is a major problem. Forest coverage has decreased to 16%, from 70% in the 1920s. Between 2000–2019, total forest coverage in Sri Lanka fell by 10%. Most elephants lived in dry zone areas of the country.

== Human elephant conflict death toll ==
Numbers of human and elephant deaths in 2010–2020
| Year | 2025 | 2024 | 2023 | 2022 | 2021 | 2020 | 2019 | 2018 | 2017 | 2016 | 2015 | 2014 | 2013 | 2012 | 2011 | 2010 | Total |
|---|---|---|---|---|---|---|---|---|---|---|---|---|---|---|---|---|---|
| Elephant deaths | 314 | 388 | 488 | 439 | 375 | 318 | 405 | 258 | 256 | 279 | 205 | 239 | 206 | 250 | 255 | 227 | 4,914 |
| Human deaths | 113 | 155 | 187 | | | 112 | 114 | 96 | 87 | 88 | 63 | 50 | 89 | 62 | 70 | 75 | |

== Managed elephant reserve ==
In 2009, authorities rolled out a plan to create an elephant reserve connecting three national parks in southern Sri Lanka. The area of land marked for this purpose comprises 23,746 hectares, excluding the area of land comprising 866 hectares marked for the Mattala Airport. As of 2021, the Southern elephant reserve project has been postponed due to numerous projects such as Mattala airport, the Hambantota harbour and the Hambantota cricket stadium. Over the past 10 years, 15,000 acres of forest lands were cleared to build for commercial purposes.

== See also ==
- Natural forests in Sri Lanka
- Agriculture in Sri Lanka
- Chena cultivation
