= Emergency shelter =

Type of temporary shelter

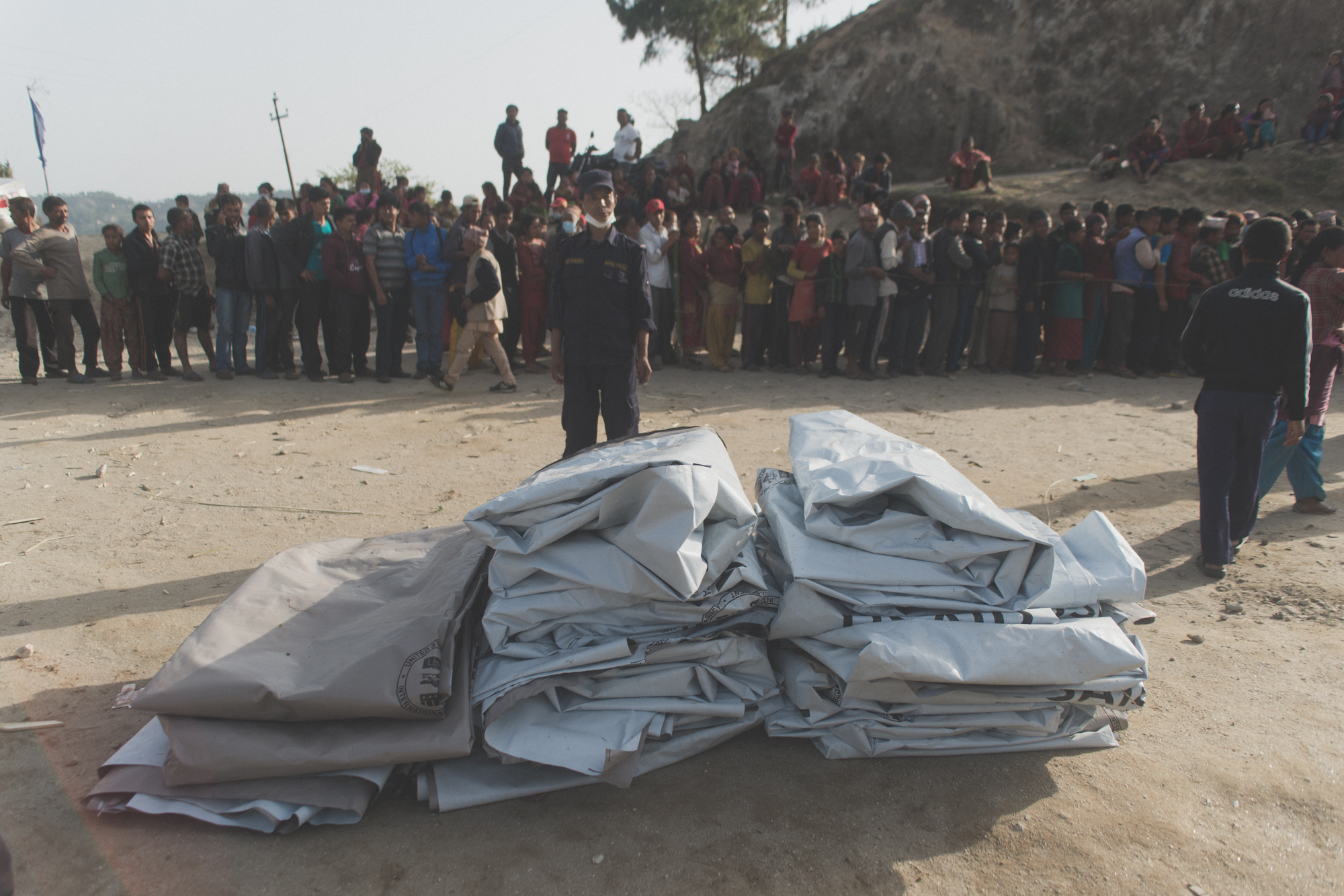
Two hundred rolls of heavy-duty plastic sheeting were given to earthquake-affected households in Nepal's Kathmandu District's Sankhu village and surrounding areas on May 1st 2015. An additional 500 rolls of this critical emergency shelter material were dispatched to Gorkha, Kathmandu, and Sindhupalchowk. The sheeting was provided by USAID's Office of U.S. Foreign Disaster Assistance and distributed by the nongovernmental organizations Agency for Technical Cooperation and Development and Save the Children

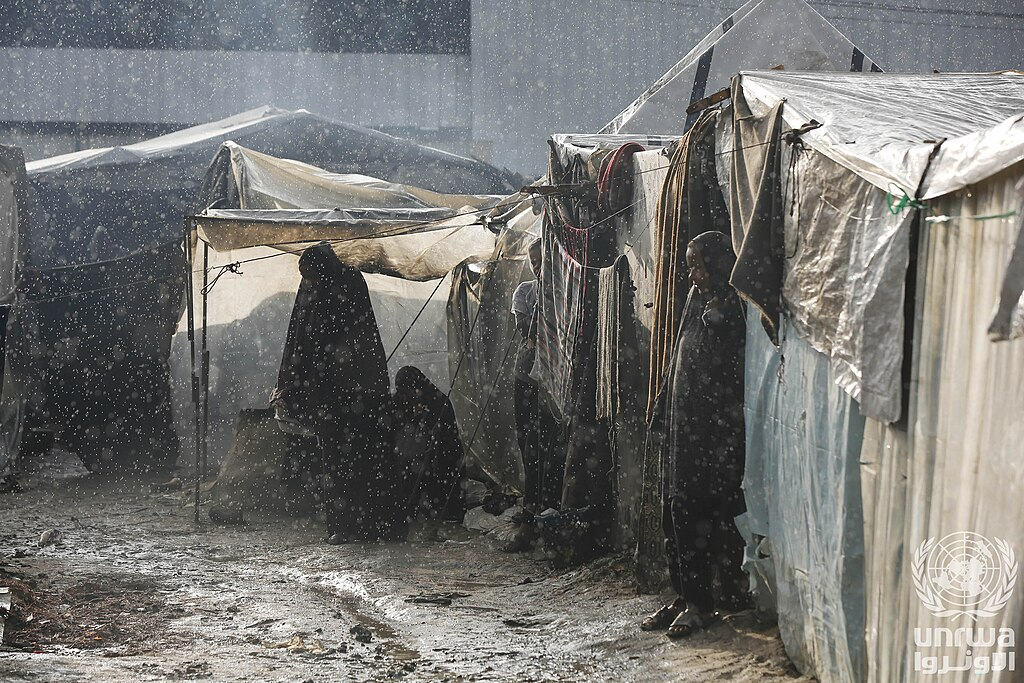
During the Gaza war displaced Palestinians used tents and tarpaulins for shelter. The UN estimated that in September 2025 around 1.3 million Palestinians in Gaza lacked tents.

An emergency shelter is a place for people to live temporarily when they cannot live in their previous residence, similar to homeless shelters. The main difference is that an emergency shelter typically specializes in people fleeing a specific type of situation, such as natural or man-made disasters, domestic violence, or victims of sexual abuse. A more minor difference is that people staying in emergency shelters are more likely to stay all day, except for work, school, or errands, while homeless shelters usually expect people to stay elsewhere during the day, returning only to sleep or eat. Emergency shelters sometimes facilitate support groups, and/or provide meals.

Post-disaster emergency shelter is often provided by organizations or governmental emergency management departments, in response to natural disasters, such as a flood or earthquake. They tend to use tents or other temporary structures, or buildings normally used for another purpose, such as a church or school. These settlements may be inhabited for the entire duration of the reconstruction process and should be thought of more as settlements than shelter, and need to be planned with respect to water / sanitation, livelihoods.

A newer category of emergency shelter is the warming center. Warming centers typically open during particularly cold or rainy nights. They are available to persons who decline to accept homeless shelters, are not allowed to use homeless shelters, or are not homeless, but have inadequate or malfunctioning heat in their homes.

== Mass emergency shelters ==
One example of a mass emergency shelter is the Louisiana Superdome, which was used as a hurricane shelter during Hurricane Katrina. More than 20,000 storm refugees crowded into the arena seeking sanctuary from the winds and waters of Katrina, filling seats, ramps, corridors, and the artificial turf field. The refugees were met with a variety of new challenges, including stifling heat, stench, filth, unsanitary facilities, and a shortage of food and drinking water. Violent assaults and rapes were reported, as well as one unconfirmed suicide.

== Sustainable design ==
Sustainable design is often employed in response to global environmental crises, the rapid growth of economic activity and human population, depletion of natural resources, damage to ecosystems, and loss of biodiversity. In 2013, eco architecture writer Bridgette Meinhold surveyed emergency and long-term sustainable housing projects that were developed in response to these crises in her book Urgent Architecture: 40 Sustainable Housing Solutions for a Changing World. Featured projects focus on green building, sustainable design, eco-friendly materials, affordability, material reuse, and humanitarian relief. Construction methods and materials include repurposed shipping containers, straw bale construction, sandbag homes, and floating homes.

== See also ==
- Civil defense
- Emergency management
- Homeless shelter
- Homelessness
- List of human habitation forms
- Natural disaster
- Warming center
