= Najidah (Australia) =

Australian nonprofit organisation

Najidah is a nonprofit secular organisation in Australia dedicated to reducing societal tolerance of abuse and the development of safer communities. Located in Queensland on the Sunshine Coast, it was founded as "Jacana lodge" (a homelessness service) in the early 1990s before becoming an incorporated association in 1999.

== Belief statement and mission ==
The Najidah Prime Statement:

"No form of abuse is acceptable. Every individual has the right to live in a safe community."

Najidah Community Development practices work for the reduction of societal tolerance of abuse; and Najidah Service Delivery contributes to the development of safer communities. All Najidah responses adhere to the Najidah Philosophy, which is contextualised in the United Nations Bill of Human Rights.

The name Najidah is of middle eastern origin. Its simple meaning is "to succour with courage" . Mythologically, Najidah was a dancer and entertainer of rich and influential men, who used her position to rescue women and children from life-threatening situations, spiriting them away to safety.

== History ==
Najidah founded its first service, Jacana Lodge in partnership with the Women's Crisis Service in 1993. In 1999, Najidah became an Incorporated Association and received Federal and State Government funding to provide accommodation services to families escaping domestic violence (DV). In partnership with the Queensland Departments of Communities and Housing, Najidah established the first specialist DV accommodation service in the Sunshine Coast region.

The organization expanded accommodation services in 2003 and again in 2005 to include medium term accommodation services and as a result, in 2006 Najidah provided in excess of 14,000 nights accommodation to homeless families. Further growth and development included a host of ancillary programs and the development of a unique accommodation service in Noosa, on the Sunshine Coast of Australia. During this time Najidah developed a national profile as an innovative, boutique organization known for high levels of effectiveness and several national best practice awards.

As the government funding Najidah received for its accommodation services requires a focus primarily on adults, such funds were not widely available to accommodate the needs of children. Najidah affirms and adheres to the national standards for working with children exposed to DV and therefore has taken steps to fundraise sufficient resources to provide a range of award-winning "child focused" programs to children in Najidah services.

Najidah's early responses to help the homeless focused primarily on accommodation. However, the problem of homelessness, in general, is far more complex and could not be solved by such measures alone, so Najidah's scope and services have broadened accordingly.

Over the years of its operation, Najidah has dealt with barriers that impede people in overcoming homelessness, by offering an holistic, integrated case management approach. This includes supporting families to address issues in the areas of health and well-being; education and children's needs; legal matters and financial matters, as well as accommodation. Using an empowerment model based on power relations theory, the Najidah approach focuses on living an independent and self determined life.

The 2003 establishment of the Najidah Community Development department broadened Najidah's operations through a series of partnerships to develop whole of community responses to homelessness, abuse and violence as well as the many social factors that create the environment in which such problems can flourish.

== Programs ==
Accommodation Services

Through the Regional Accommodation Service, Najidah provides accommodation to families affected by Domestic and Family Violence. Services are delivered with varying levels of support and length of stay, depending on circumstance.

Accommodation options include:

- Emergency – overnight to 6 weeks
- Short term – 6 to 12 weeks
- Longer term – up to 24 weeks

Service users are supported to develop and implement a plan of action to develop necessary support networks and resources for independent living. This includes planning to resolve issues in the areas of:

- Related legal matters
- Financial matters
- Health matters
- Emotional matters
- Children's needs

Head High – Young people living beyond suicide

Provides support and information for young people (and people working with young people) – who have lost someone to suicide. Winner of national youth suicide prevention awards from Suicide Prevention Australia in 2006 and 2007.

Kids Club

Kids Club is an activity-based support group for past and present resident primary school aged children at Najidah. Kids Club is a 2006 winner of the national crime and violence prevention awards.

Tiny Tots

A playgroup styled program for resident families at Najidah.

Clever Cookies

Clever Cookies provides support around developing healthy and nutritious menus inexpensively.

Family Support Program

Family Support Program provides individualized support to families.

SCIPS

SCIPS develops integrated systems of community support to children, families and staff in primary schools.

Community Ink

Community Ink is Najidahs' volunteer and tertiary student placement program, providing opportunities for volunteers to take up meaningful roles within the organization. Community Ink was the winner of the National Excellence in Volunteer management awards (QLD).

== Awards and achievements ==
- National Community Housing Association High Commendation for "Excellence in service to the community" (2005)
- Australian Crime and Violence Prevention certificate of merit (2006)
- Suicide Prevention Australia "Life Award" for Youth Suicide Prevention (2006)
- National Volunteer Awards "Excellence in Volunteer management" (2007)
- Suicide Prevention Australia High Commendation for Youth Suicide Prevention (2007)
