= Grant Woods (biologist) =

American biologist (born 1961)

Grant R. Woods (born 1961) is an American biologist specializing in white tail deer and associated land management that increases deer populations, primarily for hunting purposes.

== Personal ==
Woods is married and has two daughters. He lives near Branson, MO.

== Education ==
Woods has a Ph.D. in Forest Resources from Clemson University, a master's degree in biology from Southwest Missouri State University, and a B.S. in Zoology/Computer Information Systems, also from Southwest Missouri State University.

== Career ==
Woods is well known as a consultant on land management for increasing deer herds. He is the founder of growingdeer.com, and is noted for his ability to explain complex technical items in everyday language for hunters managing their lands. His research areas include the pioneering use of remote-activated cameras to record bucks using deer rubs during rutting season.

In 2001, Woods and his wife bought property in the Ozarks of Missouri and over 20 years transformed it into a lush habitat for wildlife. The 1500 acre property was known as the "Proving Grounds". Prior to Woods buying it, it was an abandoned cattle ranch. The improvement process comprised first eradicating invasive species, such as lespedeza, multiflora rose, and knapweed, using selective application of herbicides. Woods then used controlled burns to stimulate the germination of native seeds in the soil. By Woods' estimate, some of the germinated seeds were over 75 years old. He then added "food plots" to provide forage and cover.

In 2021, Woods sold the property and began developing another 900 acre plot known as "Proving Grounds 2.0". Since he was 61 as of 2022, his goal is to develop the land in 1/4 of the time (i.e., 5 years). He also largely eliminated the use of pesticides and herbicides and used a "no erosion" form of roads called "broad-based dips" developed at Clemson.

== Awards and honors ==
- Missouri Master Conservationist Award (2018)
