= Human-elephant conflict =

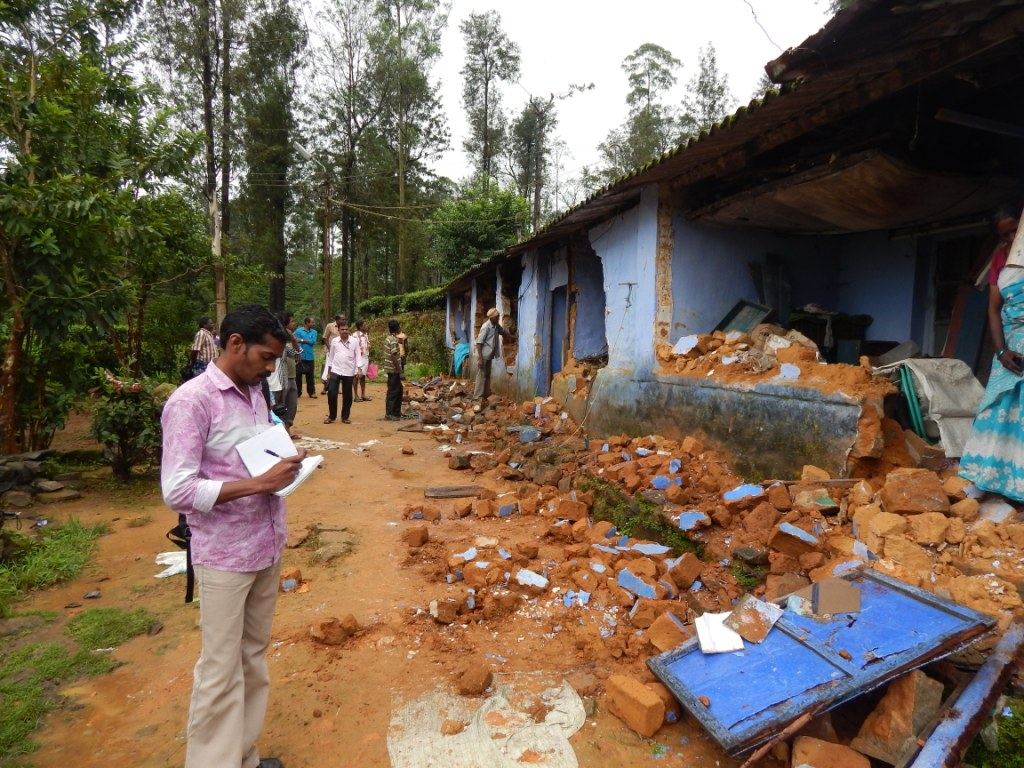
- A man stands at a home ravaged by an elephant
- Field: Conservation ecology
- Origin: Habitat loss and fragmentation

Human-elephant conflict (HEC) refers to the negative interactions that occur between humans and elephants, primarily driven by habitat loss as land is developed for agriculture or settlement and elephants are forced to compete for natural resources. Human-elephant conflict can range from crop raiding, in which elephants consume or damage cultivated plants, to violent encounters when elephants perceive a threat to their land, survival, or offspring.

Human-elephant conflict is prominent in areas where human settlement overlaps with elephant population, such as in Central and East Africa as well as parts of South and Southeast Asia. Hundreds of people are killed annually as a result, and hundreds of Asian elephants in affected countries are killed each year. Kenyan wildlife authorities state that around 120 African elephants are killed every year therein as a result of HEC. The economic impact of human-elephant conflict includes significant crop and income losses across affected regions.

Physical barriers, changes in approach to agriculture, deterrent technology, and warning mechanisms have all been proposed as potential ways to mitigate the problem of human-elephant conflict. Poisoning, electrocution, and other retaliatory methods create threats to Asian elephant populations in South Asia.

== Causes ==
The primary cause of human-elephant conflict is the destruction and fragmentation of natural elephant habitat as a result of the widespread development of land for agricultural, residential or other purposes. This forces elephants into closer proximity with humans, and also creates competition for natural resources, making the chances of a dangerous or costly human-elephant encounter more likely.

== By location ==
=== Asia ===
Human-elephant conflict is an issue for many South and East Asian nations. In Sri Lanka, the conflict results in high mortality for both species. Sri Lanka hosts approximately 10% of the global Asian elephant population within just 2% of their global range. According to a 2022 review in Applied Geography, an average of 200–400 elephants are killed intentionally each year, while 70–80 human casualties are recorded annually. Mitigation strategies in Sri Lanka include fencing and more careful scrutiny over elephant-human co-existence in landscapes where protected areas overlap with agricultural zones. In India, elephant encounters can also lead to mass-casualty incidents when elephants enter villages. One such event occurred in January 2026, when 20 people were killed in Jharkhand.

=== Africa ===
Human-elephant conflict in Africa is recognized as a global conservation issue that is primarily driven by competition for water and disruption of seasonal migration routes. Studies on various villages in countries such as Ethiopia show that African HEC often culminates in agricultural land near forested areas. In Kenya, reports indicate that around 120 elephants are killed annually as a result of this conflict.

== Mitigation efforts ==
Various methods have been proposed as ways to mitigate human-elephant conflict. For example, the International Union for Conservation of Nature recommends a multi-layered approach involving physical barriers, early warning systems, and community-led intervention. These include the installation of solar-powered electric fencing to protect human settlements and the use of thin wire circuits that trigger sirens to alert villagers of an elephant's approach. In Bangladesh, these measures have been paired with the formation of "Elephant Response Teams", which are trained to use non-lethal deterrents including searchlights and bee-sound machines to redirect stray elephants back into protected corridors.

== Impacts ==
In India and Sri Lanka, human-elephant conflict causes substantial losses for both people and elephants, with hundreds of deaths reported annually. Retaliatory killings, including poisoning and illegal electrocution, further threaten Asian elephant survival. The conflict also creates a pervasive fear in affected areas, sometimes correlating with a decrease in student attendance and discouraging farmers from using fields near forest edges, with additional effects for food security.

The economic toll of human-elephant conflict is measured in substantial crop and income losses across elephant range countries. In India, agricultural damage significantly affects rural livelihoods and land-use decisions. In China, beyond immediate crop loss, HEC can disrupt how households manage and lease agricultural plots.

== See also ==
- Osama bin Laden (elephant)
- Human-wildlife conflict
- Musth
