= Deer rub =

Damage caused to bark by a deer rubbing its antlers

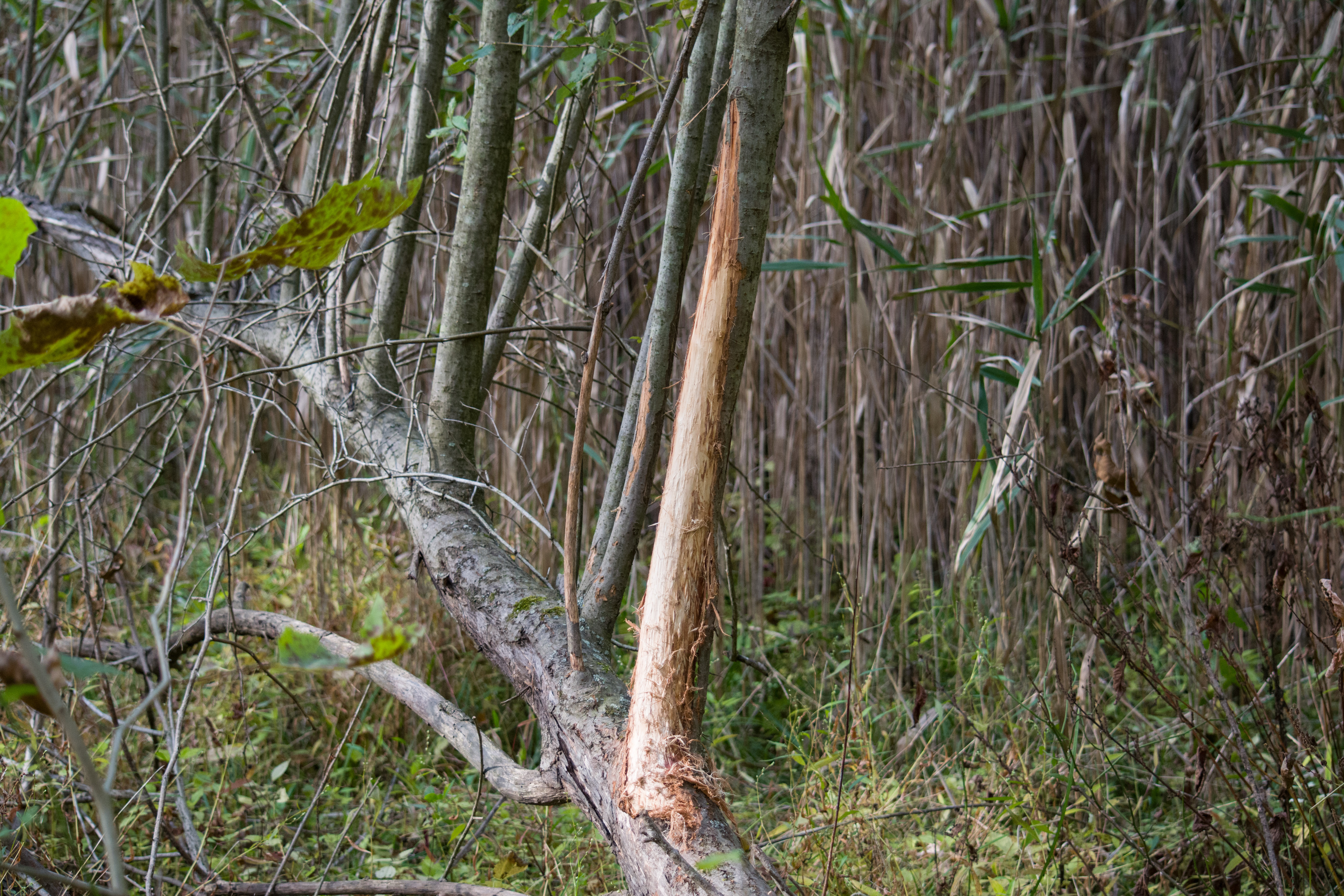
A deer rub formed in southeast PA by a white tailed deer

A deer rub describes the abrasions caused by a male deer rubbing his forehead and antlers against the base of a tree. Easy to spot in areas with high deer populations, hunters use them to find ideal locations for hunting. Rubs start to appear in late summer when male deer rub the velvet off their newly acquired antler growth. Rubs continue to appear throughout the autumn season, especially during the mating season (called the rut), until the male deer shed their antlers in winter. The area between the forehead and antlers contains a large number of apocrine sweat glands, and leave a scent that communicates a challenge to other male deer while also attracting potential mates. The size of the rub usually varies with the size of the deer.

Dr. Grant Woods, expert in deer biology and hunting, however, disputes the notion that buck scents on rubs "warn off" other bucks. Deer are not territorial. If so, then a buck would defend his rub after making it. What's more likely is that does will check out the rubs. A recommended strategy, therefore, is for the hunter to locate themselves on a path to a rub in hopes of spotting a deer heading towards it.
