= Applied Geography =

- Discipline: Human geography
- Language: English
- Edited by: Jian Peng and Yehua Dennis Wei

Publication details
- History: Since 1981
- Publisher: Elsevier
- Frequency: Quarterly
- Impact factor: 4.240 (2020)

Standard abbreviations
- ISO 4: Appl. Geogr.

Indexing
- ISSN: 0143-6228
- LCCN: 84641848
- OCLC no.: 663066772

Links
- Journal homepage; Online access

Applied Geography is a peer-reviewed scientific journal published by Elsevier. The journal covers research that applies geographic methods to solve human problems, including human geography, physical geography, and geographical information system science.

The co-editors-in-chief are Jian Peng (Peking University) and Yehua Dennis Wei (University of Utah).

== Abstracting and indexing ==
The journal is abstracted and indexed in:

- Current Contents
- Ecological Abstracts
- Elsevier BIOBASE
- Envirofiche
- Environmental Abstracts
- GeoRef
- Geographical Abstracts
- International Development Abstracts
- Oceanographic Literature Review
- Scopus
- Social Sciences Citation Index

According to the Journal Citation Reports, the journal has a 2020 impact factor of 4.240.
