= Homeless women in the United States =

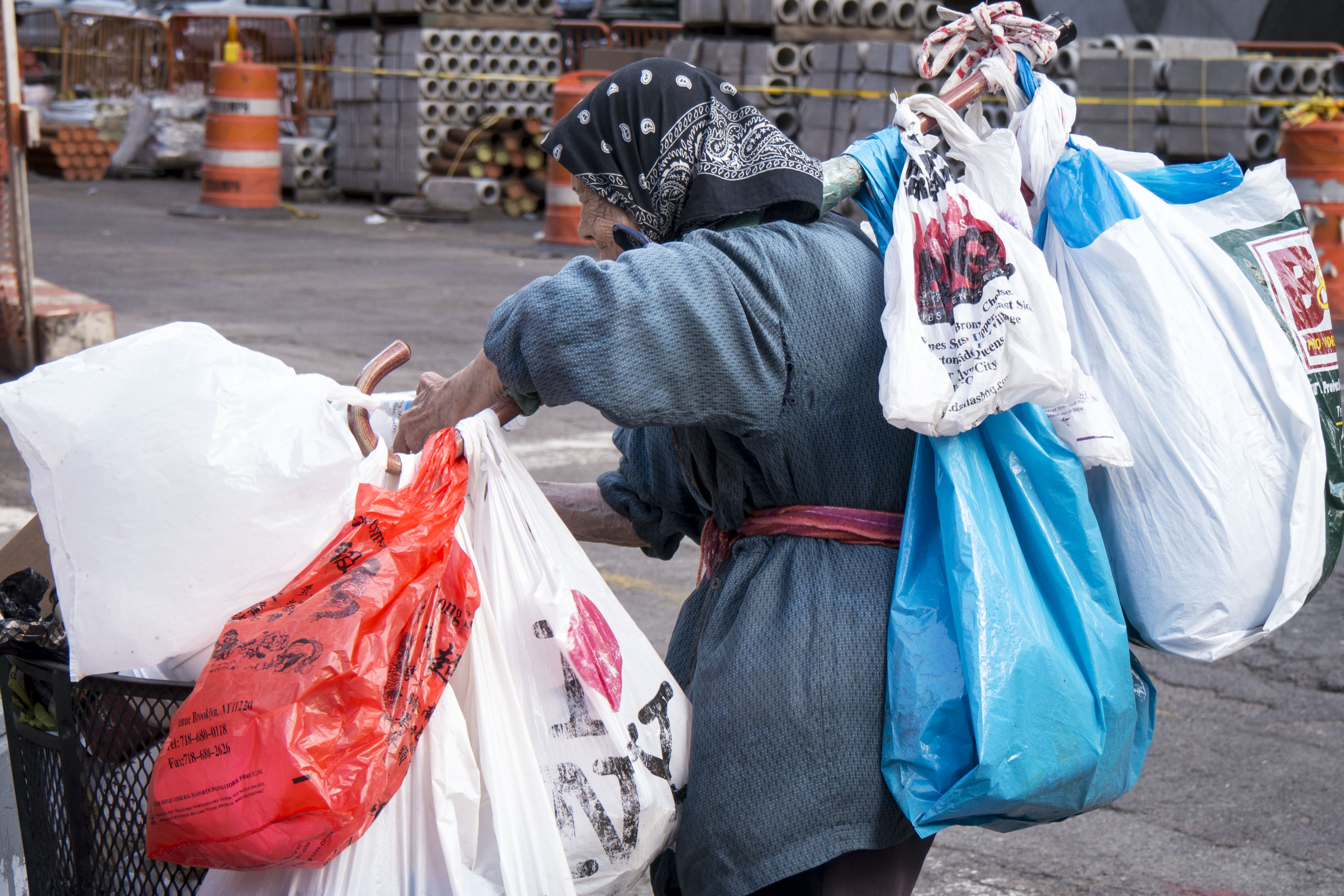
A homeless woman in New York, 2015

Out of 10,000 people in the United States, 20 are homeless with 38% identifying as women. This is a 12.1% increase in homelessness amongst women since 2022. Although studies reflect that circumstances vary depending on each individual, the average homeless woman is 35 years old, has children, is a member of a minority community, and has experienced homelessness more than once in her lifetime.

One of the primary causes of homelessness among American women include domestic violence, with research finding that around 80% of homeless women have previously experienced domestic violence. Women and families represent the fastest growing groups of the homeless population in the United States. Approximately 34% of the homeless population are families with children. With 65% of homeless women with children under 18 live with their children, while this number is only 7% for homeless men. These statistics suggest that homeless women are more likely to take care of their minor children than homeless men are. For this reason, information of homeless women is often linked to that of homeless families.

== History ==
Women have featured in records of housing insecurity in the U.S. since the first colonial movements when unhoused individuals were called vagabonds. The history of homeless women in the U.S. tracks the broader history of homelessness in this country. The Great Depression in the 1930s resulted in a spike in unhoused individuals, and the large numbers of impacted individuals resulted in recognition for the difficulty these people faced. The modern origins of homelessness date back to the 1960s, when rising interest rates and societal factors like the HIV/AIDS epidemic served as contributors. After President John F. Kennedy signed the community mental health act in 1962 the process of deinstitutionalization began, at which point there was an increase in the unhoused population.

Homelessness specifically among women and families has been marginalized and neglected by the public and the government. Most homelessness experienced by women is "hidden" in that women are not explicitly visible on the streets. Instead, a woman being homeless may manifest as residential instability, sex work, and/or insecure housing – conditions that are usually not visible to the remaining public.

The Women's Rights movement of the 1960s and 1970s sought equality for women in regards to gender roles and career opportunities. The rise of conversations around unequal pay and job access led to the realization that women were prevented from acquiring independence by current social norms and structures. Gender roles constrained women from exhibiting defiance to their male counterparts, making it so that women in relationships were reliant on their husbands to survive. This served as more than enough motivation to remain subservient rather than challenging abusive conditions they may be facing. The Women's Rights movement ventured to alter this existing standard. Where homeless shelters were unable to address the intersection of issues for women, primarily focusing on financial instability, domestic violence shelters emerged to address this lack.

== Feminization of Poverty ==
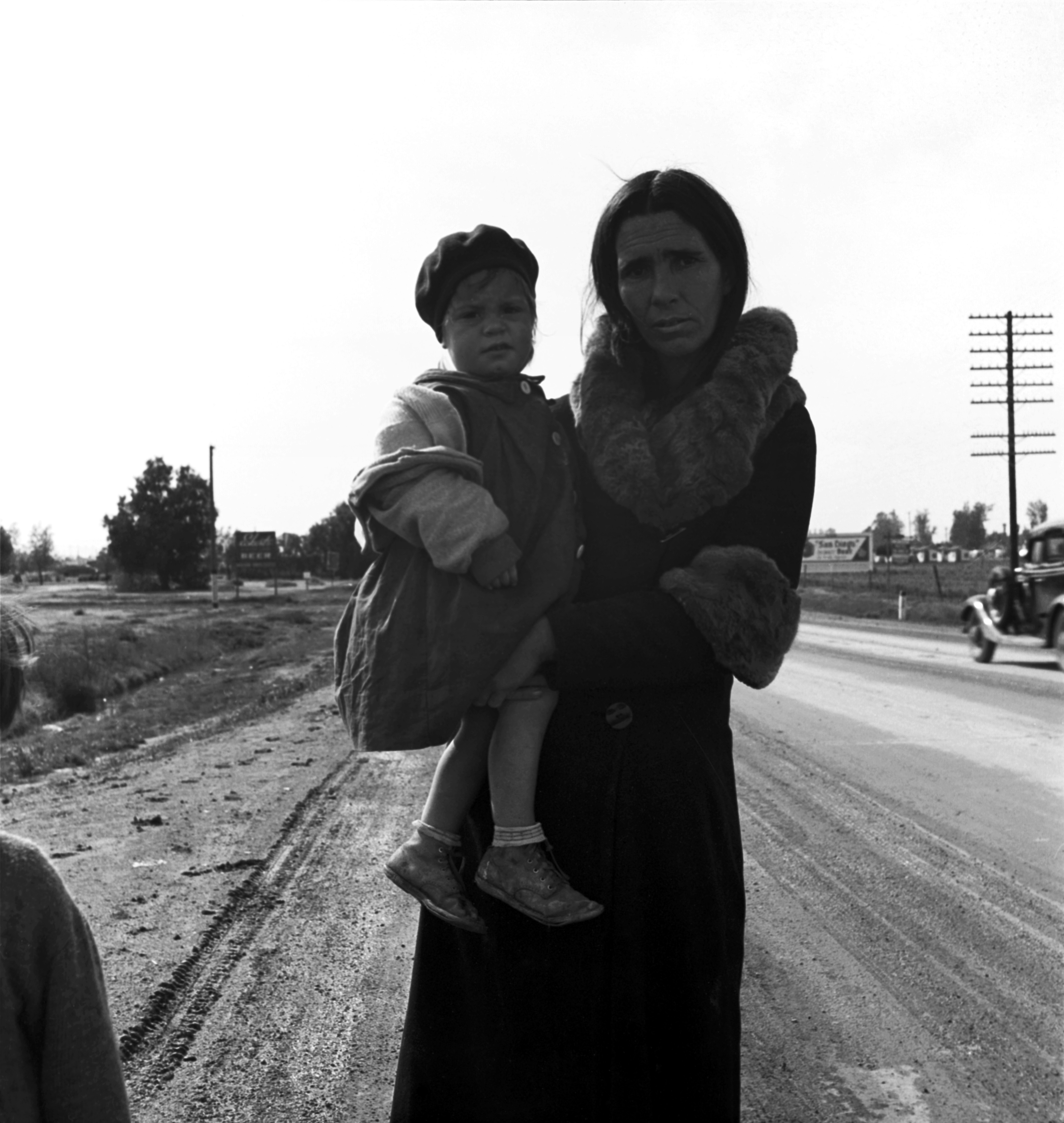
A homeless mother and her child; The U.S.

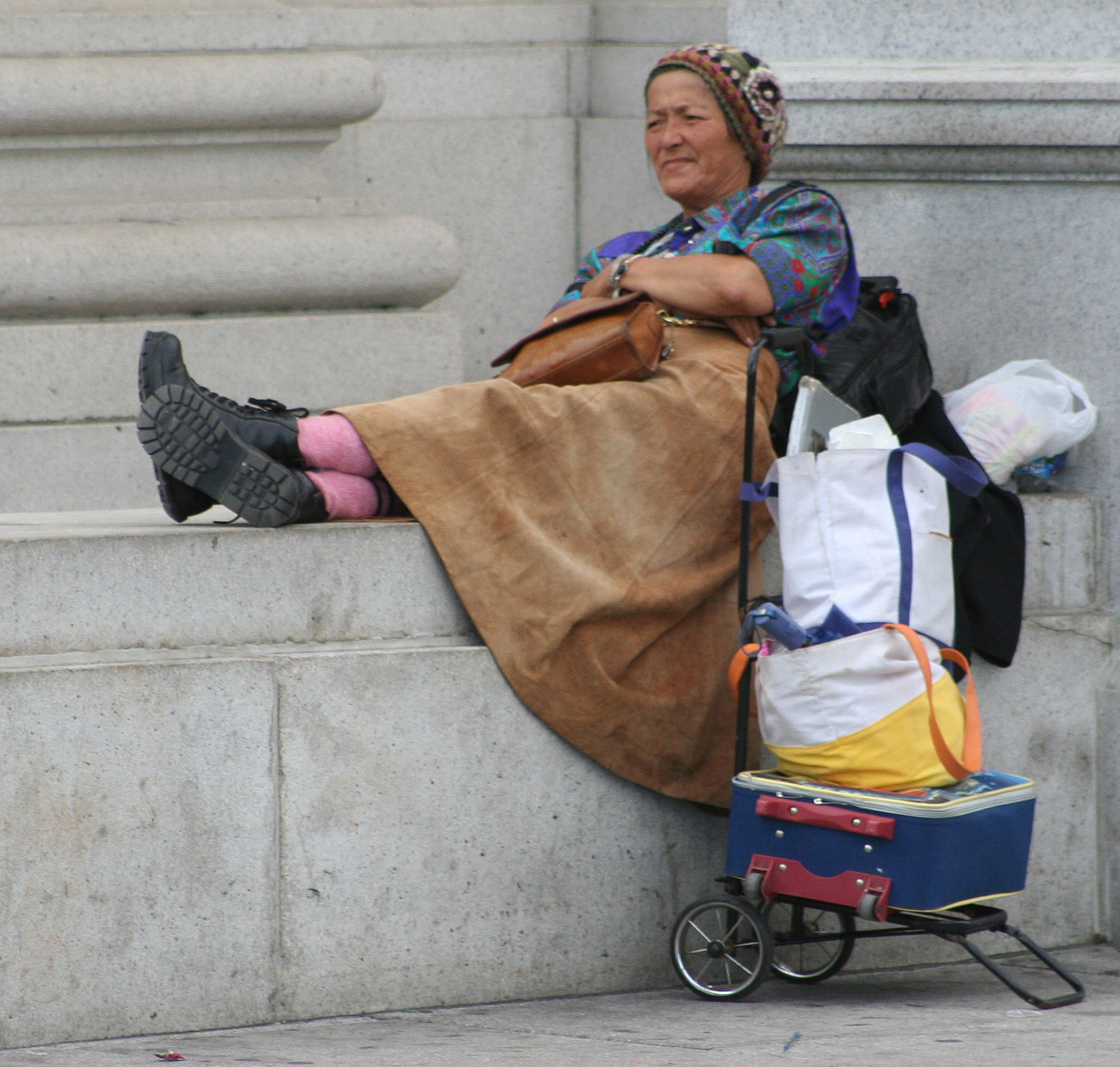
A homeless woman in Washington, D.C.

When the UN declared the world "Homeless Crisis" in the mid-1980s, it set the stage for the politicized "feminization of poverty" discourse that had developed from initial research efforts on female poverty and homelessness. In the United States, during this time, the Reagan administration instituted various policies that affected the welfare of women. "Reaganomics" was a term used to describe the policy reforms of Reagan, encompassing sharp cuts in social welfare programs, deregulation, tax cuts, and reduction of government spending. This led to what became known as the feminization of poverty, which drew attention to gender disparities in poverty rates, where more women find themselves in impoverished conditions compared to men. This trend emanates from a host of gender disparities and socioeconomic hardships women bear disproportionately. Cuts were made to programs such as Aid to Families with Dependent Children (AFDC), the food stamp program, medicare, and housing aid subsidies.

Additionally, cuts to services like daycare, abortion, and family planning, which were essential for many women's economic autonomy, further exacerbated the challenges faced by marginalized communities, leading to a higher number of women falling into poverty. The policies for women in the workplace also changed in this period, as there was deregulation of agencies like the Equal Opportunities Commission and the Administration of Occupational Health and Safety. Reagan cut funding to these agencies, leaving many women vulnerable in their places of work to discrimination, harassment, and unsafe working conditions. Initial liberal discourse on the feminization of poverty interpreted women's poverty to be the result of male irresponsibility. Feminists proposed the idea that the gender-based wage gap was contributing to this dilemma of women's poverty in the United States and argued that women should be seen as equal to men in relation to their ability to succeed when supported with the proper resources. This idea increased in popularity through the 1980s and 1990s in the US where households headed by single mothers were increasingly more at risk for experiencing poverty and homelessness.

Homeless families make up one third of the homeless population in America, with single-mother families being the highest sub category. Among homeless women, there is an overrepresentation of adults with sole responsibility of care of dependent children and inadequate financial resources. Women, especially single-parent family mothers, are more likely to live in poverty when they have children and have to balance earning money while raising and caring for their children. Children with a single mother are five times more likely to be in poverty than children with two parents. Single mothers are more likely to work part-time and to miss work in order to care for their children. Many homeless and low income women work in service industries, which offer few benefits and low wages, thus contributing greatly to their poverty. Job-based discrimination targets all women but is present on a larger scale among minority women. On average, a larger percentage of minority women struggle to obtain and maintain jobs. The "last-hired, first-fired complex" refers to the higher level of unemployment among minorities. Thus, while all women are faced with some degree of inequity in terms of job offerings (largely as a result of being expected to care for the children), the struggles of minority women are greater. Paid employment for women also offers its own challenges because most low-wage jobs do not offer affordable insurance options or child care. This leaves single mothers with the choice of accepting welfare if they are able to qualify for it in order to care for their children or going to work at the risk of leaving their children on the streets.

== Domestic violence ==
Domestic violence is a major factor contributing to homelessness among the female population. Nationally, twenty to fifty percent of all homeless women and children become homeless as a direct result of escaping domestic violence. In 2005, fifty percent of United States cities reported that domestic violence is a primary cause of homelessness, and in New York City specifically, it is reported that about fifty percent of their homeless population had been abused and twenty-five percent of their homeless population was homeless as a direct result of domestic violence. Domestic violence is believed to be embedded in a sense of entitlement or privilege, hierarchal beliefs (gender hierarchy), and cultural devaluation of women.

The women's movement provides resources and safety for the victims of domestic violence. Prior to the women's movement of the 1960s, female victims of domestic violence had few options for seeking safety. With the impetus of the women's movement, "safe homes" were created, which birthed the shelter movement. A lot of progress has been made in the fight against domestic violence since the women's movement of the 1960s. The Family Violence Prevention and Services Act was passed and has since become an important source of funding and support. The 1994 Violence Against Women Act included funding authorization to increase transitional housing for survivors of domestic violence.

Domestic violence increased during the COVID-19 pandemic in the United States; as families were forced to stay home, women were disproportionately affected. International discourse calling for the immediate inclusion of measures that protect women from violence in government emergency response policy was initiated on the local, federal and international levels. Notably, the UN called upon governments worldwide to make shelter workers and services "essential," and drastically increase funding for women's rights organizations, health and social services.

=== Trauma-informed care ===
Homeless women are more likely to have experienced childhood sexual abuse and/or foster care and adult partner abuse than the average homeless man. This has resulted in state-provisioned implementation of trauma-informed care (TIC) approaches by local, state and federal governments and programs. Trauma-informed approaches have been increasingly implemented throughout the past decade in the US, as studies and surveys have shown the overrepresentation of PTSD and other trauma-related diagnoses in women experiencing homelessness and poverty.

=== Transitional housing for domestic violence victims ===
Women who left an abusive relationship can go to a domestic violence shelter designated for battered women only for a period of thirty days. They will receive psychological help and support groups at a confidential location, making it difficult for their abusers to reach them. However, after the thirty days end, they will be asked to leave and have to move to a homeless shelter where the stay there is again restricted, varying from three to six months.

Transitional housing typically offers women more time so they can create more stability in their lives. Transitional housing usually lasts for 1-2 years. There are multiple types of transitional housing. One type of transitional housing is facility based and the other is temporary rental subsidy. Facilities are typically communal with multiple women and families who are fleeing domestic violence living in the same house or they could have different apartments. A majority of facility based programs offer services to the victims such as counseling, case management, and job programs. Participation in the services offered can become a condition of living in facility based programs. Many of the restrictions in place at facility based programs can make victims unhappy.

Another type of transitional housing is temporary rental subsidy. This option is often called “Housing First” or “rapid re-housing”. This focuses on getting people in homes so they can better receive services. Many women prefer the housing first option as opposed to facility based programs as it is less restrictive and allows them to stay in the same housing after the subsidy ends. Facility based options are better for women who are in severe danger. Women who need security and protection from their abuser often prefer the safety of the facility and are willing to deal with restrictions to stay.

Rent vouchers can turn from temporary housing into more permanent housing to help battered women find apartments in different areas in the community. The Housing Voucher Program, also known as Section 8, is a subsidized permanent housing program, where women can stay as long as they want where a portion of the rent is paid for, however, she needs to pay her portion of the rent. The waiting list to receive a voucher can take weeks to sometimes years. Further, vouchers are temporary and can last from 1–2 months up to two years, and if women have difficulty finding landlords that accept the vouchers or are unable to find a housing unit, they can lose their voucher. The percent of successful rent vouchers has been declining over time. In 1993, the number of voucher holders that were successfully able to use their vouchers to receive housing was 81%, but in 2019 the number of voucher holders that successfully received housing due to their vouchers was 61%.

Furthermore, due to the federal reporting rules of sharing information of residence of shelters, domestic violence victims must report their situations, which raises a safety concern. The national database that is being funded and required by the U.S. Department of Housing and Urban Development (HUD) is requesting all organizations to participate in HMIS (homeless management information system) which includes domestic violence shelters. HUD is responsible for homeless programs, affordable housing, and emergency shelters, including domestic violence shelters. While record sharing about homeless people and their situation can be an efficient tool in making progress in bettering people lives faster, when it comes to domestic violence shelters where the main concern is protecting survivors and providing safety, sharing information about the victims on a public database threatens the same people whom HUD are protecting and providing services for.

=== Employment ===
The average age of homeless women has increased from 20 to 50 years of age, affecting chances of available employment opportunities. Though homeless women are reported to have a strong inclinations to work again, it is difficult to find and maintain employment stability because of existing disabilities and impaired access to healthcare, impacting their ability to work.

Women who become homeless because of domestic violence also face barriers when looking for job opportunities. Victims of domestic abuse are more at risk of chronic stress, mental, and physical health problems which can impact employment opportunities and workplace performance. Oftentimes, women who are survivors of intimate partner violence are stalked, exploited, or harassed by former abusers, leading to further trauma and decreased work productivity. In a study conducted with a sample of women with abusive partners, the results showed that roughly 50% of them that were working at the time lost their job due to their abusive partner. However, there are efforts being made in the workplace to address domestic violence and its effects on victims through interventions implementing trauma informed practices. Trauma informed practices in the workplace help survivors reconcile with their experiences and understand the impact of trauma.

Homeless mothers with children under eighteen struggle to secure employment without safe child care arrangements. Compared to low-income and housed mothers, homeless mothers are less likely to receive child care aid which prevents their ability to search for, sustain, or train for jobs. Government programs such as Head Start and state funded pre-kindergarten attempt to provide child support to families below the poverty level for young children, however, there is more demand than there are available resources allocated to this type of childcare support. Programs designed to support children of low-income and homeless mothers, can increase employment stabilization by providing a safe space for children as well as reducing expenses associated with childcare.

== Resources for homeless women and families ==
=== Emergency shelters ===
Emergency shelters provide an immediate refuge for homeless women and families and are often the first point of entry for those seeking assistance. These shelters offer temporary housing and provide basic necessities such as a safe place to sleep, meals, and hygiene facilities. While emergency shelters aim to ensure safety, many face challenges such as overcrowding, inadequate funding, and limited resources, which can compromise the quality of care. Emergency shelters bridge the gap between homelessness and permanent housing, often connecting families to case management services and longer-term housing programs. For homeless women and families, particularly those escaping domestic violence, specialized shelters create an environment that promotes safety and recovery. In 2023, emergency shelters housed nearly 65% of the homeless population.

Motel-style shelters are an option for women fleeing domestic violence to get access to immediate temporary shelter when other shelters are full. Domestic violence service providers work with motels to provide shelter to referred individuals. However, these motels do not provide the emergency services that most domestic shelters provide, and can also be easily accessible to the women's abusers.

=== Case management ===
Case management is the provision of a wide range of services including assistance with securing housing, navigating complex systems like public benefits and healthcare, and connecting clients to supportive services such as job training, counseling, and childcare. Effective case management has been shown to reduce the length of shelter stays, with families receiving these services spending an average of 10 fewer days in emergency shelters compared to those who do not. The most impactful case management models emphasize "Housing First" approaches, where stable housing is prioritized alongside individualized support services to address barriers like domestic violence, mental health issues, or unemployment. Research highlights that intensive case management models, such as Assertive Community Treatment (ACT), not only improve housing stability for vulnerable populations but also reduce overall system costs by decreasing the use of emergency services.

=== Federal programs ===
Federal programs provide resources and housing solutions for homeless women and families. The Section 8 Housing Choice Voucher Program (1974), administered by the U.S. Department of Housing and Urban Development (HUD), offers rental assistance by subsidizing a portion of housing costs for low-income families. Under this program, families typically contribute 30% of their income toward rent, while the government covers the remaining cost. HUD also distributes funding through programs such as Emergency Solutions Grants (1987), which support emergency shelters, street outreach, and rapid rehousing initiatives.

Broader initiatives, such as the Continuum of Care (CoC) Program (1995), focus on creating comprehensive systems to address homelessness by funding transitional housing, permanent supportive housing, and case management services. CoC programs aim to connect families to additional resources, such as mental health care, job training, and educational support, to foster self-sufficiency. However, accessing federal programs like Section 8 often involves lengthy application processes and requires families to meet strict eligibility criteria. Furthermore, housing units under Section 8 are frequently located in low-income neighborhoods, limiting access to other community resources.

== Decline of the welfare state ==
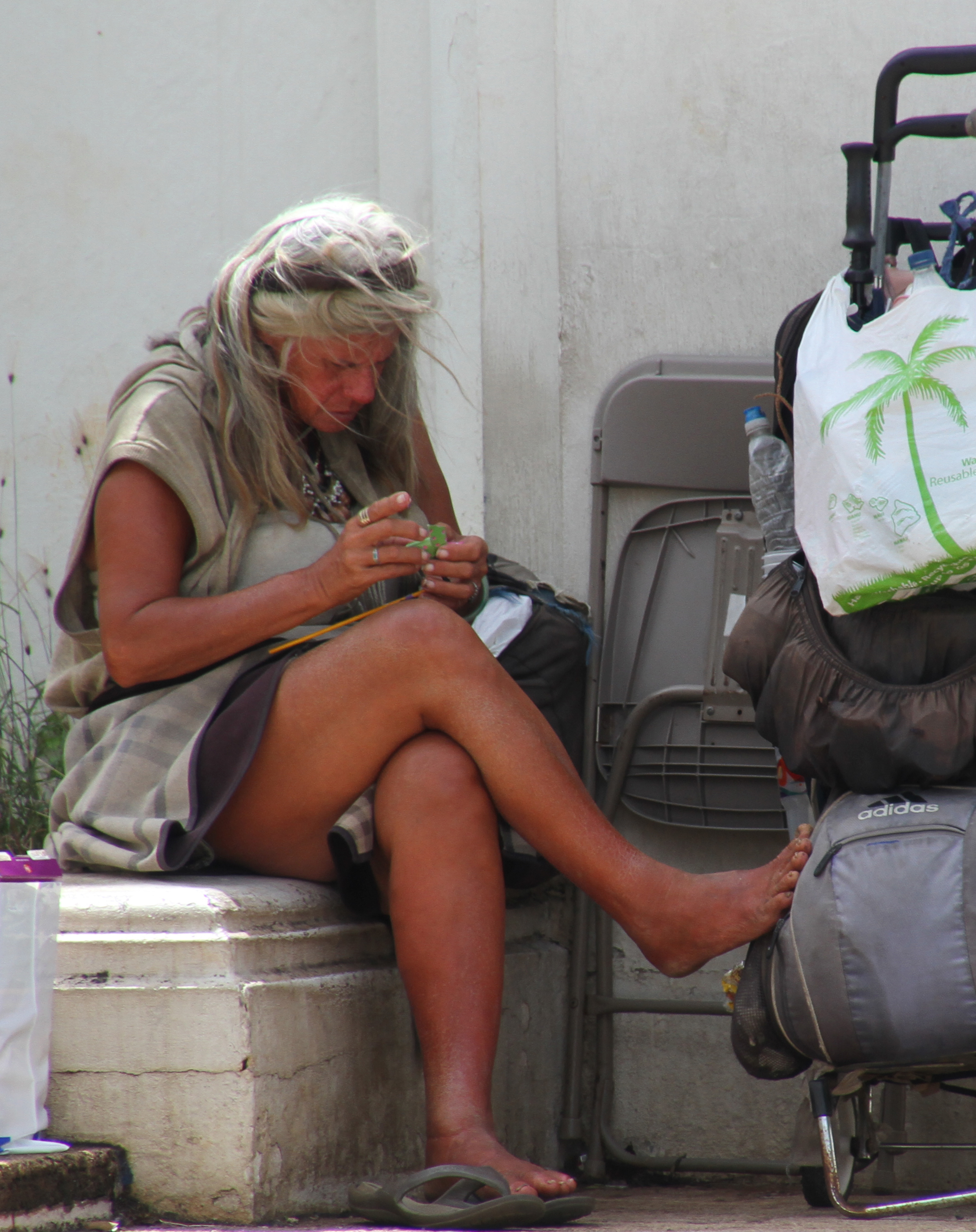
Homeless woman in Honolulu, Hawaii

Federal Aid intended to assist the homeless population has declined steadily over the years leaving financial strain on homeless families in particular. The Aid to Families with Dependent Children (AFDC) was established by the Social Security act of 1935 to provide welfare for needy children who do not have adequate parental support. AFDC grants have continued to be cut significantly since the start of the program after the enactment of the Federal Welfare Law in 1996. This significantly affects the homeless population because most AFDC recipients require housing assistance from the government, but less than 25% receive the funds they need to cover housing. This puts families into inferior housing situations in order to pay for essentials such as food and clothing.

Food stamps and AFDC money combined still left families well below the poverty line resulting in higher levels of homelessness. In 1996, President Clinton endorsed the Personal Responsibility and Work Opportunity Act which required that a person had to work in order to receive government assistance and support. The bill converted AFDC to a block grant- Temporary Assistance for Needy Families (TANF)-with fixed funding. Because TANF is a block grant, states can decide how much of the grant goes to different designated purposes. This means that needy families could have less funds if the state decides to give more money to other programs. There is also a time limit of five years that a family with an adult can receive assistance in the form of federal funds. The Decline of the welfare state significantly impacts the homeless population because they are receiving less state and federal funding.

=== Stigmatization of the female welfare recipient ===
The political stigmatization of the welfare recipient in the 1990s coincided with the defunding of the AFDC, which historically helped financially dependent mothers and families provide for themselves. It effectively alienated welfare-dependent mothers and women experiencing homelessness and living in poverty in the United States, igniting heated political debates which referred to them as "alligators" who needed "tough love". The feminization of poverty resulted in the exponential growth of this demographic, with reports concluding that 60% of poor families with children during the 1990s were single mother households. Among this demographic, single African American women and mothers were further stigmatized due to generational traumas and unconscious bias passed down from US segregation and slavery.

At the dawn of the 21st century, structural deficits were politically acknowledged as the major cause of US homelessness after decades of discourse suggesting it was a result of personal character flaws such as greed and irresponsibility. This re-politicization validated the long-held need to resist the "welfare mother" and "welfare queen" stigma by those associated with it. Women dependent on government aid began to argue that the political giants responsible for cutting funding that could have provided better paying jobs, better education, quality insurance, or affordable housing were "born with money in their pocket."

== Homeless women and crime ==
See also: Discrimination against the homeless

=== Sex work ===
Women often engage in survival sex to secure essential resources such as food and housing. A study found that 20% of women engaged in sex work to rent a hotel room and 28% slept with someone to ensure they would have housing for the night. As such, survival sex is a strategy engaged by homeless women to obtain subsistence needed for living. Many homeless women engaging in survival sex find themselves in extremely dangerous situations where they are more prone to abuse, assault, and exploitation due to the inability to negotiate safely. The act of trading sex or attempting to survive through selling oneself through sex work is very high risk for violence. Besides survival sex, many homeless female sex workers are documented to live in areas of high drug use and easy access to other drug users, which can help facilitate their own drug addictions.

=== Incarceration ===
Women are rapidly becoming the fastest growing population in United States' prisons and jails, making up 24% of the probation and 12% of the parolee population. Female offenders are also more likely to report drug abuses, specifically with methamphetamine. Many of these women have experienced traumatic life experiences, such as physical and sexual abuse, by intimate partners or family members which may reciprocate as violence towards others. Furthermore, 18% of incarcerated women with children in prison had been homeless at one point in the year before incarcerated. The disadvantaged socioeconomic position many homeless women find themselves in only worsens the violence observed in these communities, as crime becomes a means of survival for these women. Upon release, lack of safe housing stability, lack of social support, and poor coping strategies increase the chances of re-offense. Many women report needing more assistance with job placement, healthcare, increased efforts of de-stigmatization, and safe housing to reintegrate into society and avoid chances of further criminal offenses.

=== Victimization ===
Homeless women who have experienced traumatic life experiences early in their life have increased chances of increased substance use and violent victimization. Compared to sheltered homeless women, non-sheltered homeless women have a 35.5% rate of sexual victimization and 56.8% physical victimization. Many homeless women turn to drug usage to attempt to suppress traumatic memories, however, this behaviour may increase their chances of abuse and cruel treatment. To avoid this, women are forced to be hyper vigilant of their surroundings and remain isolated in order to protect themselves, especially during the night if they are unable to secure safe nighttime housing.

On the streets, homeless women are left vulnerable to harassment from other homeless men and police officers. Therefore, many women remain in violent relationships with other homeless men because it is seen as being safer than facing it alone.

== Health and healthcare ==
The odds of someone becoming homeless within a year are roughly 1 in 194, a relatively large chance considering the total population of the United States. In the 1960s, homeless women totaled around 3% of the entire homeless population, however, as of 2016, they comprised nearly 40% While all homeless people are at an increased risk of poor health outcomes, homeless women are less likely to benefit from routine medical assistance, health insurance, cancer screening, adequate prenatal care, appropriate ambulatory care, and specialty care. Women have distinct health needs from men, homeless women face increased obstacles in meeting their most basic health needs. Specifically, unhoused women suffering from substance abuse, depression, or domestic violence have the greatest health care need. Homeless women face health challenges such as arthritis, mental illness, substance abuse, victimization, and Sexually Transmitted Infections (STIs).

Homeless women are more at risk for injuries and illnesses but receive a disproportionate amount of health services compared to housed women, in fact 57% of this group do not have a regular care provider. Often, unhoused women avoid doctors until it is an emergency, or they are forced to use unconventional resources – such as being participants in a study in order to receive healthcare – which are very risky. Health care providers characterize homeless women as their most vulnerable patients, with past experiences of trauma being prevalent among these patients. Healthcare providers can play a role in improving health outcomes of unhoused women by identifying their unhoused or at-risk patients. Many factors intensify homeless women's lack of needed health care, like expensive health insurance, expensive medications, long wait times at clinics, lack of transportation, and more.

Women and mothers who experience housing insecurity live in a high stress state which is associated with multiple health problems such as hypertension, chronic pain, and asthma. Compared to women with housing stability, homeless women are at higher risk of mental illness, higher mortality rates, and poor birth outcomes. The specific experience of unhoused women is often ignored in health care and community resources.To serve clients appropriately, case workers and doctors should be required to address an individual's background and lived experiences holistically. Without asking extensive questions, women can not get all of the help and information they need. There has been little research conducted on the accessibility of health care for victimized women, which likely means that many women do not get the sufficient care that they need. Male caseworkers can be a particular trigger for victimized women during their recovery period. If homeless women are only treated for being homeless, other underlying issues like sexual or drug abuse can be overlooked, and they cannot be fully helped. A study of the physical health problems of homeless men and women found that on average men had eighth physical health issues, while women had an average of nine issues.

=== Menstrual health ===
Menstruation represents an additional challenge faced by unhoused girls, women, and menstruating people. These challenges include stigma, access to toilets, water and menstrual products, and lack of information. Homeless women are often forced to use improper, unsafe, and often unsanitary objects in order to manage their menstrual blood flow. The repeated use of makeshift feminine hygiene products and lack of access to working restrooms and showers can lead to many health complications such as toxic shock syndrome, urinary tract infections, yeast infections, and vulvar contact dermatitis which arises when the genitals are not cleaned daily, or at all during menstruation. As early as 1990s, homeless women were identified to be more likely than housed women to suffer from gynecological health problems, with menstrual-related issues accounting for the majority of diagnoses.

Additionally, feminine hygiene products are taxed in 45 of the 50 U.S. states because these items are considered luxury goods. This means that homeless women are even less likely to afford necessary supplies for their periods. Taxation on sanitary products is considered a discriminatory practice, this impacts the accessibility and affordability of menstrual products for low-income and homeless women.

Menstrual Health for Women in New York City

With New York City having one of the highest homeless populations in the United States, it is important to use it as an example for the rest of the country when making health-pertaining decisions. New York City's female homeless population staggered over 4,500 individuals during the Summer of 2022. On a monthly basis, these women must deal with the struggles of their menstrual health. Examples of these struggles include obtaining menstrual hygiene products, maintaining personal hygiene, and finding solutions for dealing with pain. When women are unable to properly deal with these hygiene-related issues, they put themselves at higher risk for disease. In a 2020 mixed-methods study with the Coalition for the Homeless in New York, it was deduced that homeless women in shelters and on the streets experience this issue with managing their dignity and comfort on a monthly basis. In 2021, Governor Hochul recognized the issue at hand by requiring feminine hygiene products to be provided free to those at the shelters.

=== Pregnancy ===
In the United States, homeless women have higher rates of pregnancy than housed women. Although it's hard to measure pregnancy rates among homeless women, estimates show that between 6% and 22% of young unhoused females may be pregnant. Studies show that up to 25% of homeless women report being pregnant or having been pregnant in the last year. Pregnancy presents a challenge to the process of finding housing stability due to its physical and mental stresses.

Women experiencing homelessness during pregnancy are at higher risk for birth complications. Their children are also at higher risk of low birth weight, and nutritional or substance abuse-related physical and neurological effects on newborns. Most unhoused women lack access to prenatal monitoring, with only 33% of pregnant homeless women reporting having one prenatal check.

=== Nutrition ===
Malnourishment has been identified as a factor that impacts the health of the overall homeless population. Research has found that homeless women have higher nutritional deficits than homeless men. While most unhoused women, 81%, have reported satisfaction with their meals, they often lack adequate nutrition. Up to 96.4% of homeless women have a deficient diet, lacking in vegetables, fruits, milk, cereals, and meat. On average, unhoused women eat 2.25 meals a day, which likely results in a caloric deficit. Studies have also found that unhoused children are at higher risk for iron deficiency, which may indicate the presence of more nutritional deficiencies.

Interventions aimed at improving nutrition among unhoused women must address factors that impact food behavior such as mental health and the inability to afford varied and healthy foods. Most effective strategies embed nutritional care into existing services leading to sustained changes in food-related outcomes.

=== Infectious diseases ===
Infectious diseases are common among the homeless population as they often have no access to medical care. Common diseases include Herpes Simplex Virus type 2 (HSV-2), Human Immunodeficiency Virus (HIV)/Acquired Immune Deficiency Syndrome (AIDS), and others (3). In the United States, about 21 to 24% are infected with HSV-2 as compared to 88% among homeless women and an even higher prevalence among HIV positive homeless women. Despite this seroprevalence, homeless women are not considered to be a high-risk population in national guidelines. HSV-2 increases the risk of HIV infection. Most homeless women are unaware of their HSV-2 infection, which renders them more vulnerable to HIV exposure.

Besides financial instability, the contraction of HIV/AIDS has been shown to be more associated with homelessness. Homeless women are more likely than poor, housed women to practice unprotected sexual activity with multiple partners exposing themselves to HIV and other Sexually Transmitted Diseases (STDs).

One study estimated that roughly 64% of homeless women participated in unprotected sex, and 60% are infected by one or more STDs such as chlamydia, herpes, genital warts, gonorrhea, syphilis, or trichomonas, with the most prevalent being Human papillomavirus (HPV). The contraction rate of HIV/AIDS to be three times higher in homeless women than housed women. Unprotected heterosexual sex is also the most common way HIV is spread to homeless women in the United States, with intravenous drug abuse and needle sharing followed (3). Unfortunately, due to their lack of quality health care, the homeless population are also more likely to die from HIV/AIDS.

=== Mental health ===
Homelessness is often closely associated with poor mental health; both as a precursor and consequence of becoming homeless. Mental illness is reported in 30% of homeless persons, and in 50% to 60% of homeless women. Homeless women without children are often more likely to disclose a mental illness, which can include antisocial personality behavior, depression, stress, and post-traumatic stress disorder.

== See also ==
- Homelessness and mental health#United States
- List of tent cities in the United States
- List of homeless relocation programs in the United States
- Homelessness
