= List of homeless relocation programs in the United States =

For several decades, various cities and towns in the United States have adopted relocation programs offering homeless people one-way tickets to move elsewhere. Also referred to as "Greyhound therapy", "bus ticket therapy" and "homeless dumping", the practice was historically associated with small towns and rural counties, which had no shelters or other services, sending homeless individuals tickets to the nearest large city. More recently, a nationwide investigation by The Guardian in 2017 found that many homeless relocation programs are offered by cities with high median incomes, helping people move to places with cheaper housing and a lower cost of living, but also fewer economic opportunities. While some individuals welcome assistance to help them relocate, others say that they have felt "targeted" and forced to move, under the threat of arrest by police.

== Debate over effectiveness ==
Proponents argue that there are legitimate reasons for seeking to reunite homeless people with their friends and family in other locations. Returning to places they have lived before can help people reconnect with their support networks and find a place to sleep until they are able to rebuild their lives.

Critics counter that while some instances can result in positive outcomes for the individuals being relocated, the programs in general have served as a convenient way for cities to reduce their own homeless populations and associated policing, medical, and support costs. In aggregate, they argue, the programs have essentially pushed homelessness to other jurisdictions, rather than provide support services or eliminate homelessness.

=== Data on long-term outcomes ===
In 2017, The Guardian published the findings of an 18-month investigation, obtaining data from 16 cities with homeless relocation programs. The cities themselves were able to offer almost no information about the long-term outcomes for bus ticket recipients after they had reached their destinations, making it difficult to assess the success of those programs.

While some relocation programs check whether individuals are subject to local arrest warrants before helping them leave town, others do not. An investigation by The Sacramento Bee published in 2013 suggested that dozens of mental health patients who received bus tickets after being discharged from Rawson-Neal Psychiatric Hospital were later involved in a range of crimes and found that some of them were suicidal.

Many cities count every homeless person given a free relocation as a person who successfully "exited homelessness", thereby making cities' homeless programs appear more successful than they are, especially considering cities rarely even attempt follow up to determine whether the person was able to find housing at their destination. For example, in one three-year period, half of the people that San Francisco claimed to have successfully moved out of homelessness had simply been given bus tickets to be moved out of San Francisco.

== Examples of relocation programs by state ==
State	City	Description
California	San Diego	During a criminal trial in 1990, San Diego police officers and supervisors testified that they routinely "cleared" downtown streets of "transients" by rounding them up before dawn and moving them to other jurisdictions such as National City or other unincorporated areas in the county.
California	San Francisco	The City of San Francisco has a program called Homeward Bound, first started when Gavin Newsom was mayor. Between 2005 and 2017, the city of San Francisco sent 10,500 homeless people out of town by bus. A 2019 article in The New York Times reported that many bus ticket recipients were missing, unreachable, in jail, or homeless within a month after leaving San Francisco, and one out of eight returned to the city within a year.
Florida	Key West	The southernmost Homeless Assistance League (SHAL), a nonprofit operating the homeless shelter in Key West, suspended its homeless relocation program at the end of September 2016, due to lack of funds. Until that time, SHAL had sponsored more than 350 bus fares to leave Key West. In return, clients had to promise never to return to Monroe County.
Georgia	Atlanta	In 1996, the Atlanta Police Department defended its homeless relocation program in the run-up to the Olympic Games, saying that tickets were only offered to individuals with family members or a job elsewhere.
Hawaii	Honolulu	In 2009, nonprofit Waikiki Care-A-Van stated that it was helping two or three people each month return home to the mainland United States, providing them with clothes for the flight, transportation to the airport, and buying tickets. In 2016, The Orlando Sentinel reported that in 2014, as many as 120 homeless individuals in Waikiki were sent back to the mainland, to be reunited with family and friends.
Nevada	Las Vegas	Between July 2008 and April 2013, the state-run Rawson-Neal Psychiatric Hospital discharged 1,500 mental patients, sending them via taxi to a Greyhound bus station and on to cities across the U.S., sometimes while heavily medicated. An investigation by The Sacramento Bee found that out of 1,000 patients given one-way bus tickets, more than 325 had been sent to California. The investigation also found that dozens of relocated patients appeared to have been involved in crimes after they were discharged, including murder, attempted murder, assault, drug crimes, sex crimes, and theft, in addition to vagrancy-related offenses. It also found that in some cases, the program had helped patients who had been accused of committing crimes in Las Vegas skip town.
Nevada	Reno	The Homeless Evaluation Liaison Program (HELP) is run by local police officers out of an office within the Greyhound bus station in Reno. Individuals may apply for a free bus ticket only once. Officers call the contact named by the applicant to confirm that someone will in fact be taking them in once they arrive at their destination.
New York	New York	The Guardian has suggested that New York City may have been the first American city with a homeless relocation program, starting in 1987. As of 2017, the New York City Department of Homeless Services was spending $500,000 annually on relocation, making it significantly larger than other schemes across the United States. The Guardian reported that New York spent 20% of its budget on airfare to destinations such as Puerto Rico; Atlanta, Georgia; Orlando, Florida; the Dominican Republic; Mexico; and even New Zealand. New York was also unusual for sponsoring moves for entire families.
New York	New York	Since 2017, New York City has offered Special One-Time Assistance (SOTA) grants to homeless shelter residents who have been earning a steady income. The program funds one year of rent anywhere in the U.S. and Puerto Rico, and is only provided if the households have demonstrated that they will likely be able to earn enough to pay for rent themselves once the grant has ended. New York City reported spending $89 million on SOTA vouchers to help 5,100 households move out of shelters between August 2017 and August 2019, of which nearly two-thirds moved out of the city, including 1,200 households that moved to Newark, New Jersey. In December 2019, the city of Newark filed a federal lawsuit to stop the city of New York from sending people to live in the Newark area, charging that SOTA recipients were often being sent to live in uninhabitable conditions, lacking heat and electricity, and with "excessive vermin".
Oregon	Portland	Portland started its homeless relocation program in 2016. In 2019, city officials told The New York Times that of the ticket recipients it had been able to reach, nearly half had lost their promised housing three months after leaving Portland. In its fiscal year ending June 30, 2019, the city sent away 383 individuals to places such as Las Vegas, Seattle, and Phoenix.
Texas	Unspecified	In January 2024, Governor Greg Abbott's office claimed to have relocated "over 100,000 migrants to Sanctuary Cities". An itemized list of tens of thousands of people with undisclosed immigration status were allegedly sent to Washington DC, New York City, Chicago, Philadelphia, Denver, and Los Angeles respectively.
Washington	Seattle	As of 2019, the city of Seattle offered flexible, one-time financial assistance for the homeless, rather than a dedicated bus ticket program. Bus tickets were also offered by nonprofits such as the United Way of King County, which reported funding about 116 journeys out of the region in 2018.

== See also ==
- Homelessness in the San Francisco Bay Area
