= Greyhound therapy =

Practice of buying mental health patients Greyhound bus tickets

Greyhound therapy is a pejorative term used in the US health care system since the mid-1960s to refer to mental health authorities' buying a ticket on a Greyhound Lines bus or other coach bus to get rid of possible "troublemaker" patients.

The practice is still in use in certain mental-health circles.

Diesel therapy or motorcoach therapy or "bus therapy" are similar terms for the practice and are usually used pejoratively.

== See also ==
- List of homeless relocation programs in the United States
- Health care in the United States
- Penal transportation
- Homeless dumping
- Rawson-Neal Hospital
