= Diesel therapy =

Prisoner treatment by transportation

Diesel therapy is slang for prison transportation in the United States in which prisoners are shackled and then transported for days or weeks; the term refers to the diesel fuel used in prisoner transport vehicles.

It has been alleged that some inmates are deliberately sent to incorrect destinations as an exercise of diesel therapy.

The case of former U.S. Representative George V. Hansen involved accusations of diesel therapy, as did the case of Susan McDougal, one of the few people who served prison time as a result of the Whitewater controversy. Other alleged recipients include Rudy Stanko, who was also the defendant in the speeding case that ended Montana's "free speed" period.

The term "diesel therapy", or "dumping", is also used to refer to a method by law-enforcement personnel of getting rid of troublesome individuals by placing them on a bus to another jurisdiction. This is also known as bus therapy and is akin to Greyhound therapy in health care.

== See also ==
- Penal transportation
- Prisoner Transportation Services
