= Prisoner transport vehicle =

Vehicle designed or redesigned to transport prisoners

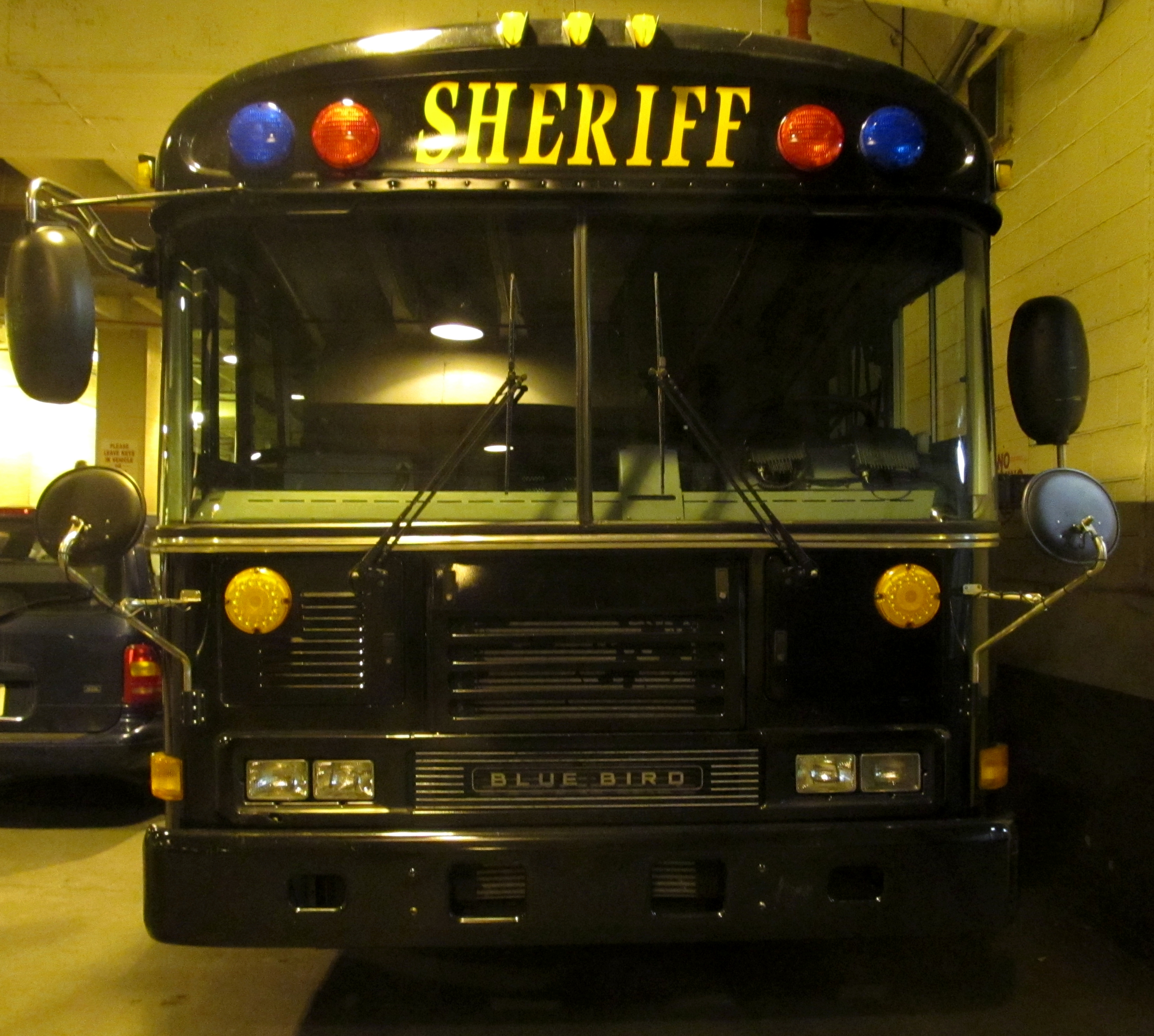
The Blue Bird All American FE Cuyahoga County Sheriff's Office Prisoner Transport Bus. This bus makes five trips a week from the county jail to other prisons with 30 prisoners on board.

A prisoner transport vehicle, informally known as a "Sweat Box" or “Court Bus” amongst British prisoners, is a specially designed or retrofitted vehicle, usually a van or bus, used to transport prisoners from one secure area, such as a prison or courthouse, to another. Less commonly, aircraft, railcars or vessels are also similarly fitted. These vehicles must be highly protected and may feature bars or wire mesh over the windows, bulletproof glass, segregated prisoner compartments, and additional seating for escorting officers.

== Function ==
Due to their relatively low security and potential isolation from assistance while en route, police or additional corrections vehicles sometimes escort high-risk transports. With this in mind, vehicles may also be equipped with radio communications, global positioning units, additional restraints and weapons, and other emergency equipment. To add additional security, prisoners are typically restrained while in transport and may be physically secured to the vehicle, handcuffed while in the secured area, or a combination of both.

Prisoner transport vehicles may be operated by police services (see paddywagon), correctional services, field officers, court services, federal agencies such as the United States Marshals Service, or be contracted to private security companies. Prison buses were widely used in the late 1900s to transport prisoners, especially to state prisons across the US. They were usually quite secure and offered no way of escape for transporting prisoners.

In Canada, most provincial governments have their own fleet of prisoner transport vehicles built to specifications developed to meet their own particular needs. All vehicles, however, must meet the Canadian Motor Vehicle Safety Standards (CMVSS) to be licensed for use. These vehicles are usually built by an authorized second-stage vehicle modifier who will affix the National Safety Mark to the vehicle after completion and testing. In the past, police officers used to carry prisoners on horse-drawn wagons, but they gave way to vans in the 20th century. As well, prisoner transport is mostly done by civilian units within many Canadian police forces.

In Hong Kong, those detained by police and other agencies were once placed on open-ended lorries or prisoner carriers with two rows on benches. Today police vans are often used to carry these individuals. Hong Kong Correctional Services transport prisoners to and from court in vans, buses or trucks.

== Images ==
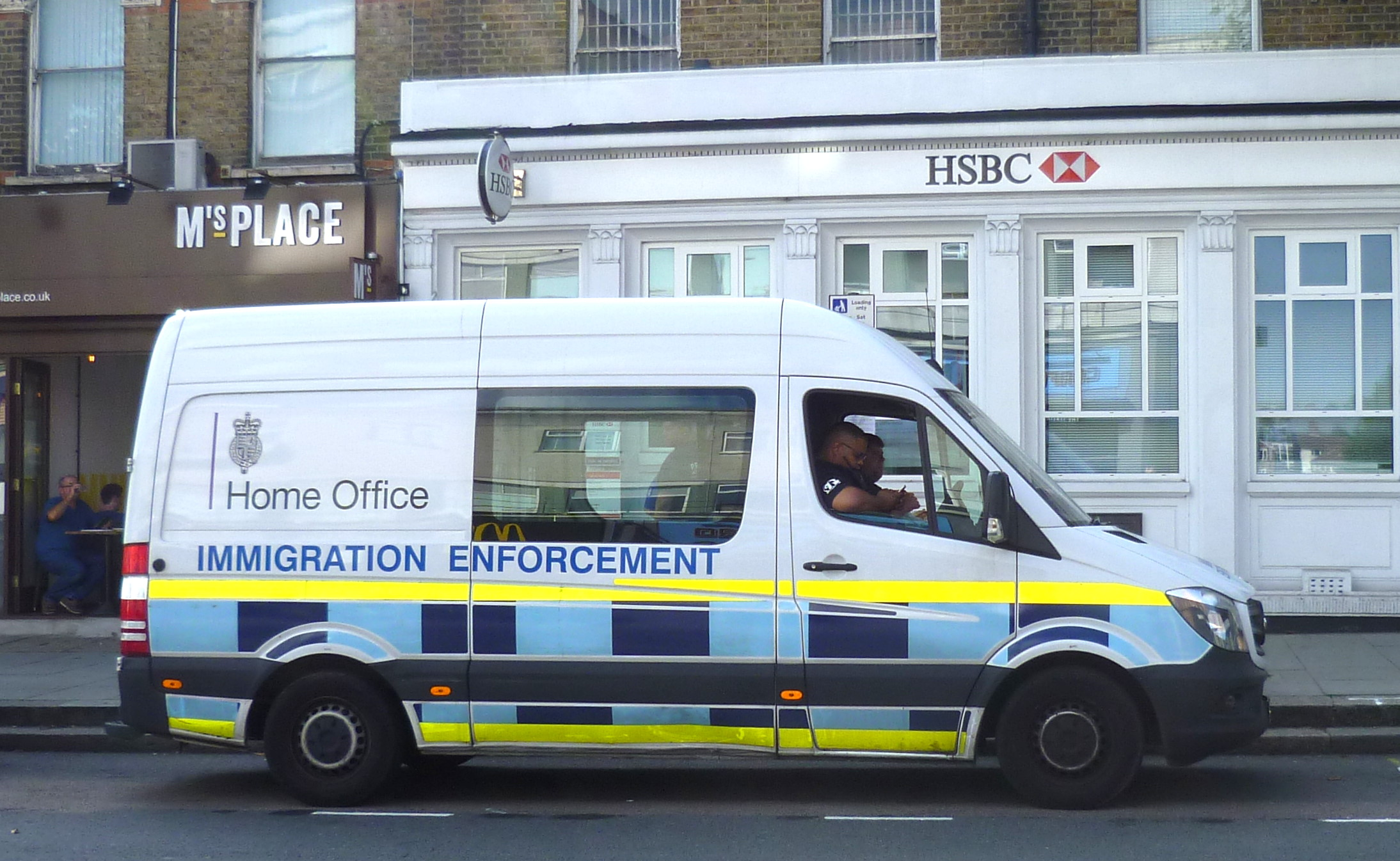
A Cell Van used by UK Immigration Enforcement to transport detainees

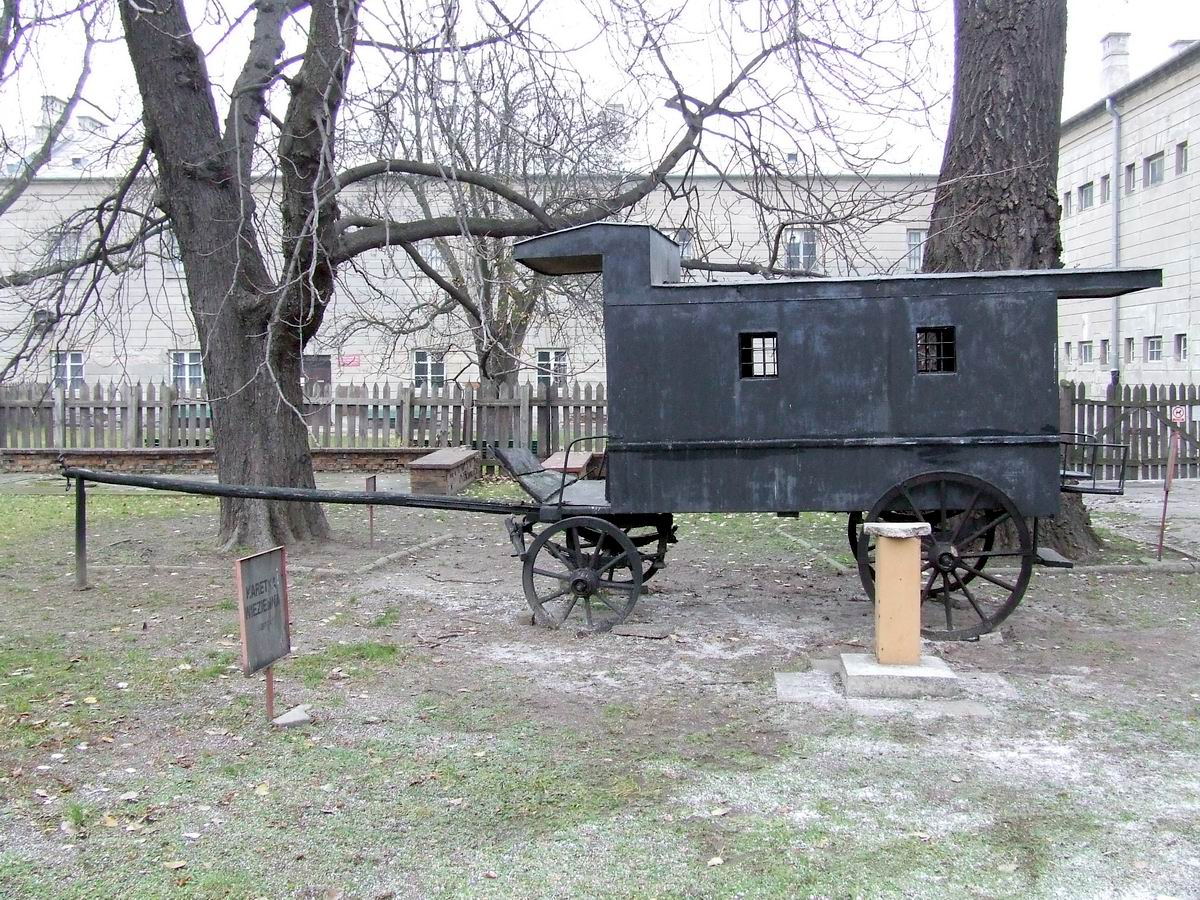
19th century Russian kibitka wagon used for transporting political prisoners

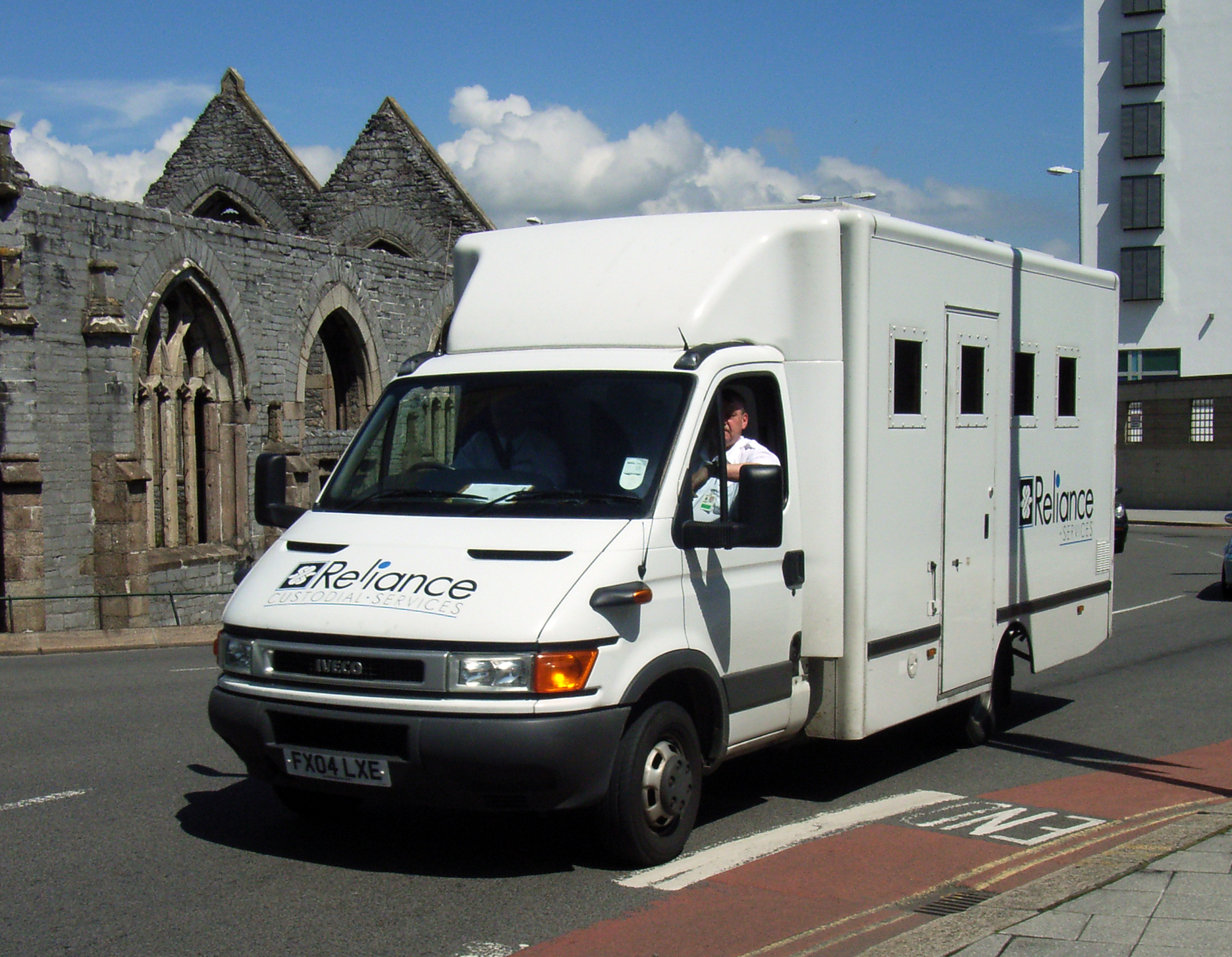
British prisoner transport vehicle.

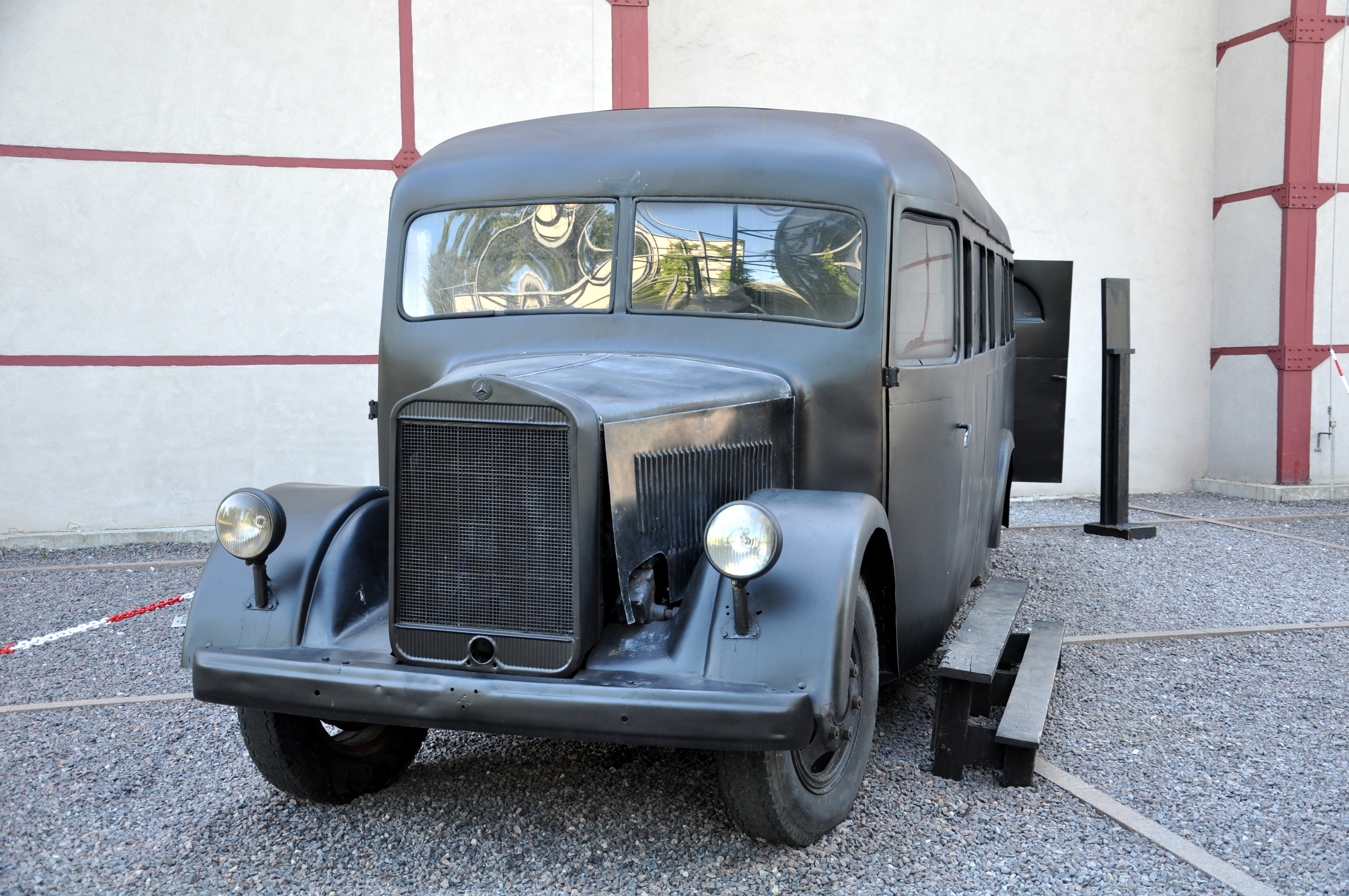
A reconstruction of the "black crow" prison bus used by the NKVD during the Katyn massacre in 1940.

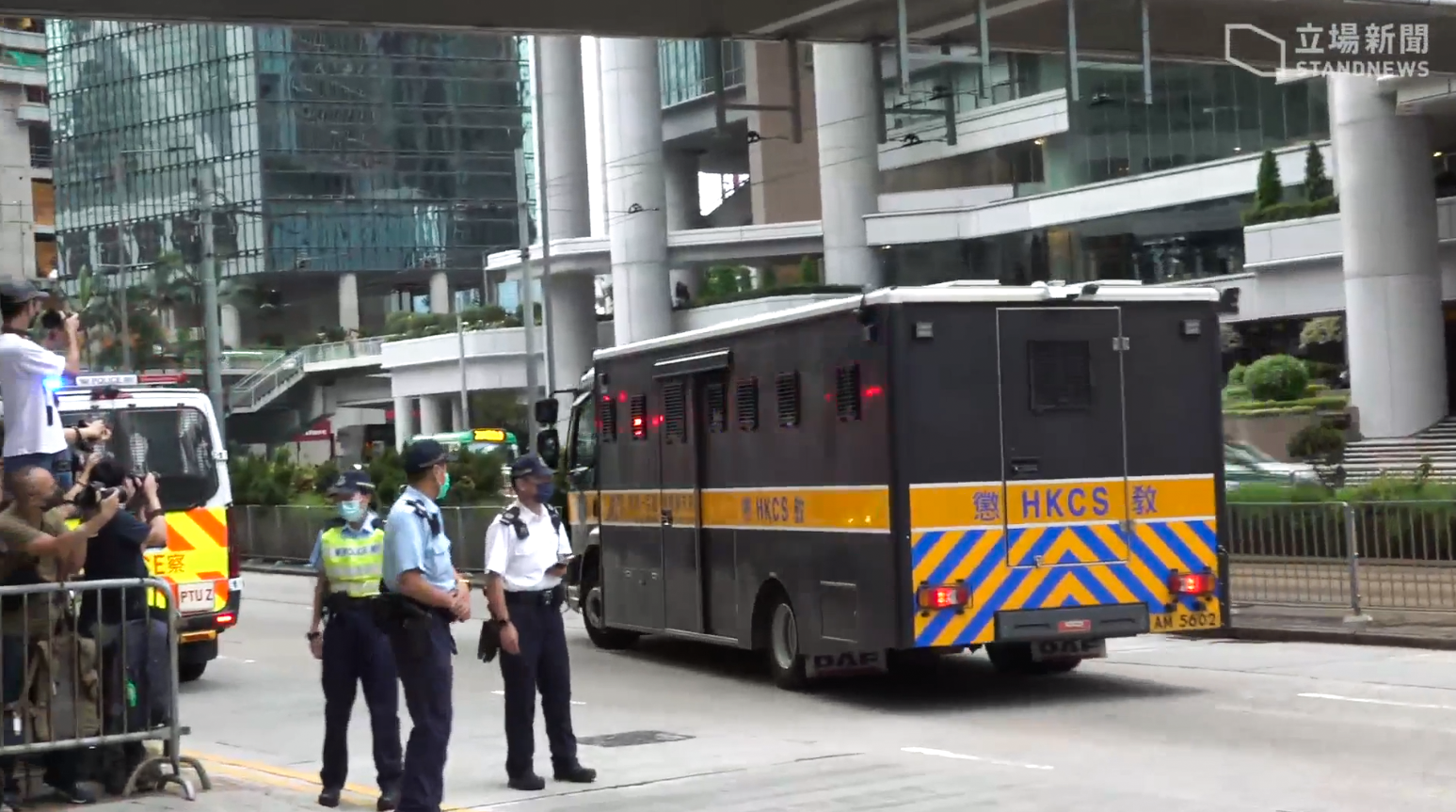
Hong Kong Correctional Services Department's prisoner transport vehicle

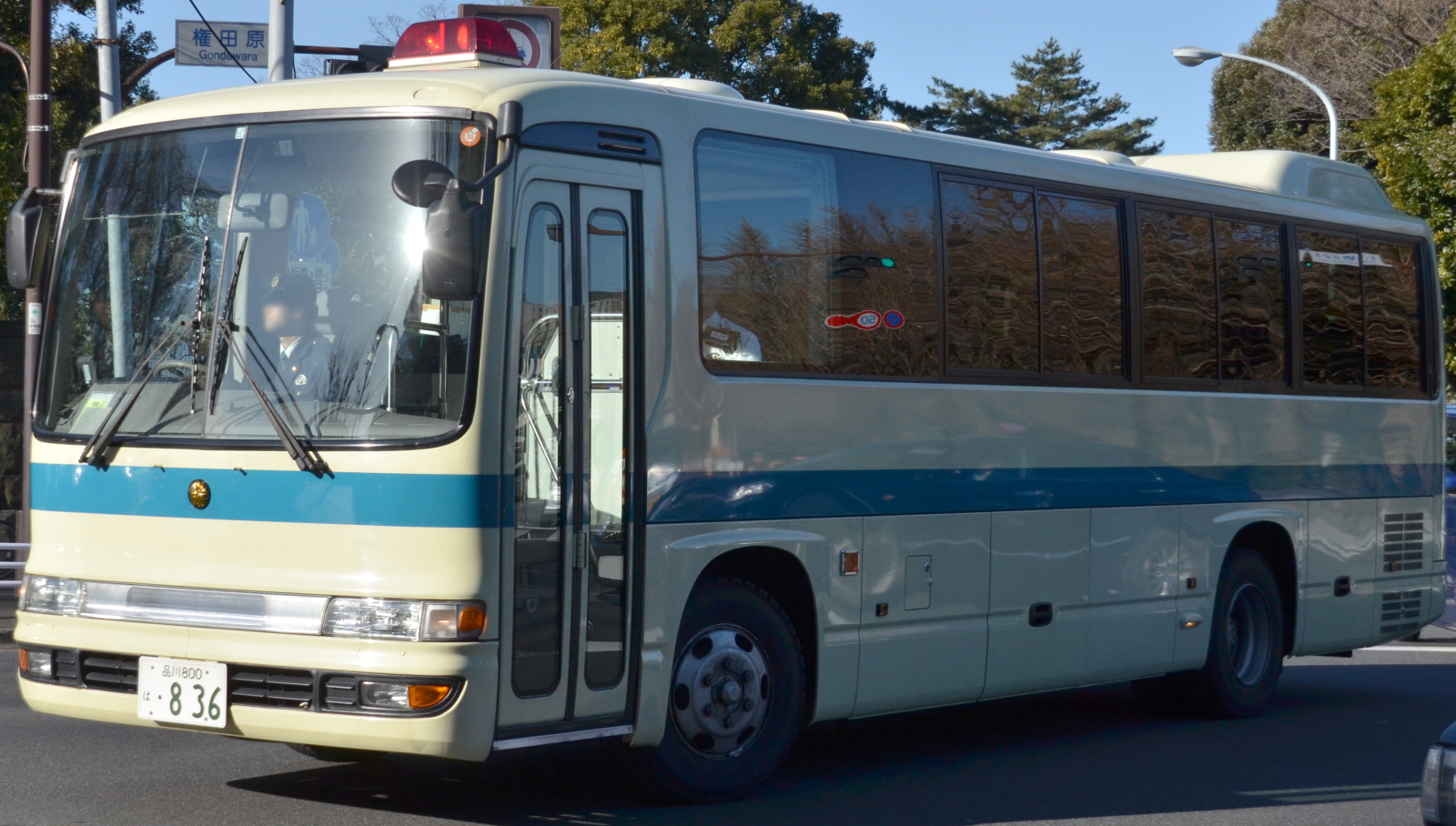
Japanese large size prisoner transport vehicle

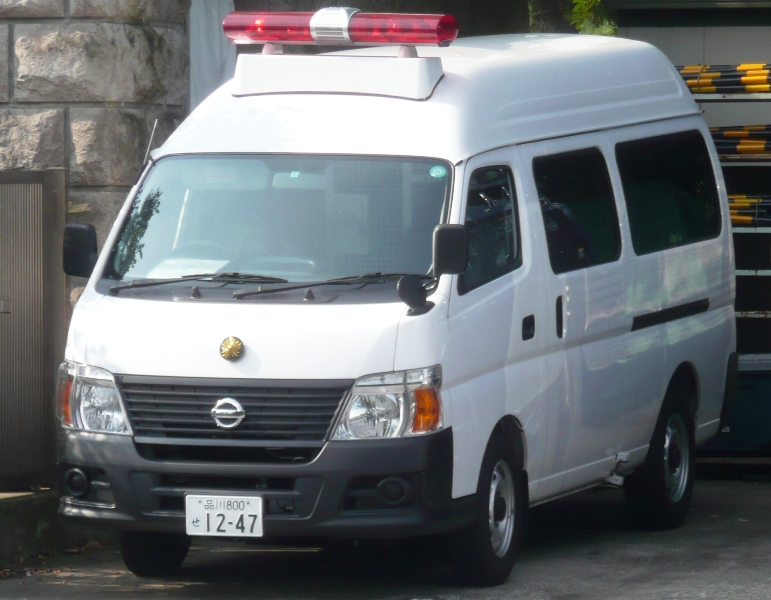
Japanese small size prisoner transport vehicle

== See also ==
- Police van (Black Maria, paddywagon)
- Police bus
- Stolypin wagon
- Paddywagon
- Diesel therapy
