= Rawson-Neal Hospital =

Geography
- Location: Las Vegas, Clark County, Nevada, United States
- Coordinates: 36.15274°N 115.22694°W

Organization
- Care system: Public
- Type: Specialist

Services
- Emergency department: No
- Beds: 212
- Speciality: Psychiatric

History
- Opened: August 28, 2006

Links
- Lists: Hospitals in Nevada

Rawson-Neal Psychiatric Hospital is a mental hospital located in Las Vegas, Nevada. It opened as a 190-bed facility on August 28, 2006. The hospital is operated by the state of Nevada.

== Controversy ==
On April 22, 2013, San Francisco's City Attorney Dennis Herrera, said that he opened an investigation into recent newspaper reports that a Nevada mental hospital was illegally busing hundreds of newly discharged psychiatric patients to California and other states. A Sacramento Bee investigative series documented what it described as rampant "patient dumping." A former patient from the hospital, who was a hospitalized there three times between 2012 and 2014, said that it was common practice. During his stay, he saw patients discharged before recovery was reached if they would agree to go to another state. The patient said he observed this many times and that patients were discharged early were sent to other states, including Maine, California, Florida and Colorado. He said that during his time there, all patients were encouraged to reach out to family members in other states if they wanted to speed up their discharge.

The Bee published a series of articles that revealed that the facility has, since 2008, discharged some 1,500 patients, some of them still mentally ill and indigent, with one-way Greyhound bus tickets to out-of-state destinations without adequate provisions for food, medication, housing, or medical treatment, a practice derisively termed Greyhound therapy. The report found that a third of the patients were sent to neighboring California, the bulk of them arriving in Los Angeles and 36 in San Francisco. Further investigation by Cynthia Hubert and Phillip Reese of the Sacramento Bee revealed that patients had been bused as far away as New York City, Chicago, Miami, and Boston. In February 2014, the Sacramento Bee journalists Cynthia Hubert and Phillip Reese received George Polk Awards for their coverage of the scandal, and were finalists for a Pulitzer Prize.

On April 29, 2013, officials identified nine employees involved in the improper discharge of patients. Two of them were terminated, three were disciplined, and four others were no longer with the hospital. On January 9, 2014, federal officials warned Rawson-Neal and gave Nevada officials 90 days to correct federal EMTALA standards deficiencies or risk losing its CMS certification and federal funding. At an inspection, conducted on March 12, 2014, the state facility was found to be largely compliant with regulations and will continue to be reimbursed by the Centers for Medicare and Medicaid Services.

On August 7, 2019, The Nevada Current News released an investigative report about several mental health care professionals and psychologists claiming to be bullied by their boss, Dr. Shera Bradley. The anonymous employees quoted in the report claim to have left employment at the Rawson-Neal Hospital because of the alleged abuse. The lone source of record, Dr. Ben Adams, was dismissed from the hospital following his claims of abuse. All complaints of bullying made to the Nevada Division of Public and Behavioral Health were investigated and found to be without merit. Witnesses Adams identified in his complaints were interviewed by the Current. They say they have not been contacted by either the Division of Public and Behavioral Health or the Board of Psychological Examiners. The article went on to state, "Mental Health America has ranked Nevada last in the nation for mental health access and treatment three years running. Nevada ranks almost last — 48th in the nation, for the number of psychologists per capita, with 13.5 per 100,000 residents. The national average is 65 per 100,000 residents, according to a report compiled by the Nevada Legislative Counsel Bureau.
