= Ximending student feces-throwing incident =

2012 scandal in Taipei, Taiwan

On the evening of 12 May 2012, two students from Taipei Private Qiangshu High School splashed feces and urine on homeless people in Ximending, Taipei City, Taiwan for amusement. Other accompanying students and friends recorded the acts and uploaded the footage to the internet, which drew widespread public condemnation. The students later expressed remorse. The school initially planned to expel the students, but as there was no legal basis for expulsion, the punishment was withdrawn and replaced with demerits and community service.

== Incident ==
The individuals involved were Chen Tai-an, a student at Qiangshu High School and the son of Chen Wan-tian, chairman of Baitaiyuan Group; fellow students Zeng Bo-jin and Ji Guan-yu; and Lü Jia-yi, a friend of Zeng Bo-jin.

Led by Zeng Bo-jin, the four began on 1 May 2012, and over the course of five consecutive days, used beverage paper cups to collect their own feces and urine. They then randomly splashed the waste on homeless people in Ximending, mocking them with remarks such as, “You drink too many beverages—let me pour some urine for you to drink so you won’t get thirsty.” The locations included Exit 1 of Ximen MRT Station and a clothing store next to the Hanzhong Street Police Substation of the Taipei City Police Department.

The individuals who physically threw the feces were Zeng Bo-jin and Chen Tai-an. Ji Guan-yu was present but did not participate and attempted to stop the behavior. The acts were recorded on video and uploaded to Facebook under the title “On a Mission”, with a caption stating, “Our former cram school teacher also said that stimulating them like this could help them work harder to escape the homeless lifestyle.”

After the video spread widely online, the students were harshly criticized by the public. Chen Tai-an and Zeng Bo-jin were labeled the “feces-throwing teenagers”and the “feces-throwing duo.”

=== Police involvement and apologies ===
Chen Tai-an's father, Chen Wan-tian, was the vice chairman of the Police Friends Association of the Republic of China and had extensive connections within law enforcement. He asked Lin Hong-ming, then deputy commander of the Fifth Investigation Unit of the Criminal Investigation Division of the Taipei City Police Department, to mediate the situation and attempted to pay hush money to the homeless victims.

On 12 May, Chen Tai-an and Zeng Bo-jin, accompanied by Lin Hong-ming, turned themselves in to the authorities. After police questioning, the two knelt before the media to apologize, promising not to reoffend, while Chen Tai-an's mother also bowed in apology. Chen Tai-an later uploaded a video stating that he would do his best to assist homeless people and other disadvantaged groups. Chen Wan-tian apologized via text message, stating that his son suffered from mental illness and asking the public to give him another chance.

=== School and government response ===
Qiangshu High School convened an emergency student affairs meeting and, citing damage to the school's reputation, issued expulsion orders for the two students on 13 May. The following day, the Taipei City Department of Education ruled that the expulsions lacked a legal basis. The school therefore rescinded the punishment and replaced it with demerits and mandatory community service.

The school also stated that it would strengthen human rights education and moral education for all faculty and students.

On 15 May, Taipei Mayor Hau Lung-bin stated that the feces-throwing incident was not only an educational and social issue, but that caring for disadvantaged groups must become part of education and, ultimately, part of Taipei's civic culture.

=== Legal consequences and aftermath ===
A total of six homeless individuals were victimized in the incident, though none formally filed criminal complaints. One victim stated that he hoped the parents would bring the students to offer sincere apologies and compensate for damaged clothing and bedding. Another homeless interviewee said that although he felt deeply humiliated, he was unwilling to file a lawsuit under the “public insult” provision of the Criminal Code of the Republic of China, lamenting, “I’m homeless—what right do I have to sue someone?”The Taipei City Police Department ultimately imposed a fine of NT$1,500 under the Social Order Maintenance Act for “soiling another person’s clothing.”

After the incident, Chen Tai-an changed his name to Chen Jing-wei.

=== Response ===
About one week after the incident, a short video titled “Kind-Hearted Young Masters of Tainan’s China Medical University” appeared online. In the video, two students from the Department of Information Management at Chung Hwa University of Medical Technology distributed 30 loaves of bread to homeless people in Tainan, in an act meant to satirize and criticize the feces-throwing behavior. Many netizens praised the action, while others argued that filming and publicizing the act was motivated by a desire for fame and was not fundamentally different from the motivations behind the feces-throwing incident.

The two students stated that they were not seeking fame, but hoped instead to inspire greater compassion in society.
