= Discrimination against homeless people =

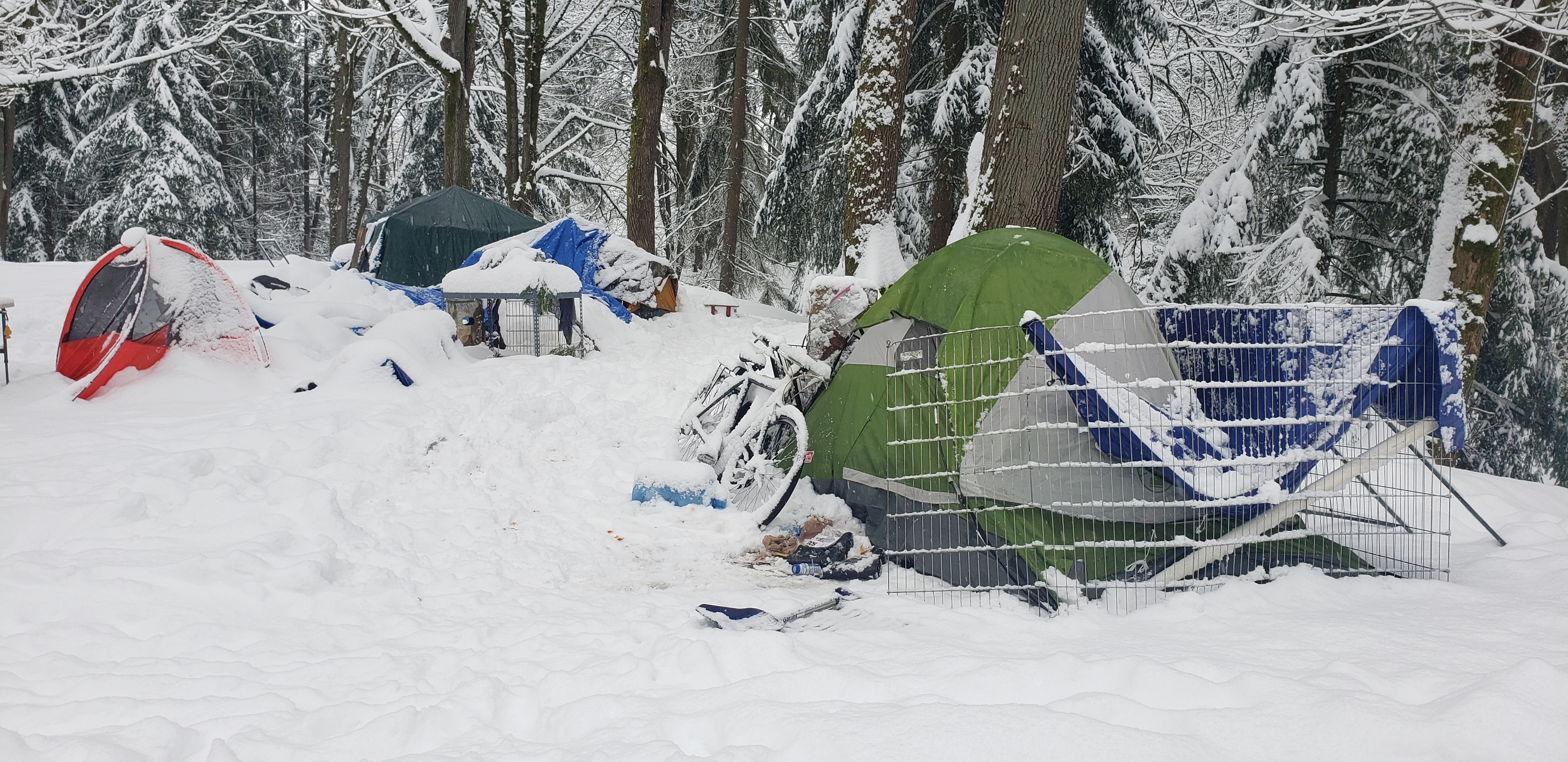
Homeless tents in the snow in Woodland Park, Seattle

Discrimination against homeless people is a form of aporophobia which is categorized as the act of treating people who lack housing in a prejudiced or negative manner because they are homeless. Other factors which can compound discrimination against homeless people include discrimination on the basis of race, religion, gender, sexuality, age, mental illness, physical disability and other considerations.

Discrimination in the forms of social ostracization, institutional prejudice, and punitive legislation impacts homeless individuals, leaving well documented negative affects such as reducing reported rates of well-being, fracturing perceived social support, decreasing access to goods and services, increasing substance abuse, and prolonging the duration of homelessness.

== History of discrimination in the United States ==
"Homelessness" as a term was first used in the United States after the emergence of the Industrial Revolution. During this period of time the demand for agricultural work and trade work shifted instead to a demand for factory workers who would find themselves dependent on wages from a wealthier employer. The term "homelessness" was first coined in the 1870s as a response to the negative perception Americans had of the many young men travelling the country who were viewed as troublemakers and nontraditional tramps due to their unwillingness to participate in factory work.

The modern conception of homelessness can be marked as emerging in the 1980s when homelessness was drastically exacerbated by an economic recession, low wages, high housing costs, gentrification of the inner cities, insufficient social services, the HIV/AIDS crisis, the crack epidemic, and the deinstitutionalization of the mentally ill.

As of 2023 the rate of homelessness was at an all-time high in large part due to the persistent issue of stagnant wages, high housing costs, cuts to social services, and continually emerging drug crises. In addition, incarceration rates have disproportionately increased while jailhouse programs tasked with providing ex-offenders with job training and tangible employment opportunities have been cut, leaving a sizeable segment of the population with decreased resources to avoid poverty and potential homelessness.

== Intersectional analysis of discrimination ==
Social discrimination against homeless people is well documented and can differ depending on gender, race, age, sexuality, and other factors. For instance, research focusing on adults who self identified as part of a sexual or gender minority revealed that this cohort reported higher rates of discrimination and subsequent mental health deterioration as a result, oftentimes leading to increased substance abuse. This study also revealed that despite differences among sexual and gender minority adults, the most commonly reported reason for experiencing discrimination was perceived to be a reaction to their status of homelessness instead of other characteristics such gender or sexuality.

Intersectional studies of discrimination revealed that mothers face higher rates of eviction than men due to gendered stigma, with African American and Latina women being disproportionately affected. Accessing shelter and preventative assistance was found to be deterred by fear of attracting the attention of Child Protective Services, as well as the stigma associated with substance abuse and the perceived correlation to poor parenting. Stereotyping involved with substance abuse is complicated by mothers reporting higher rates of forced or coerced dependence on substances by a second party, and institutions often lack the knowledge or resources to adequately address these disparities, which leads mothers to feeling shamed and discouraged from seeking assistance.

Studies of young people experiencing homelessness have provided a cross analysis including minoritized groups and subsequently revealed that gender minorities reported lower levels of hope caused by comparatively decreased access to social support. This was due to perceived rejection from family members and peers, and led to increases in substance abuse and lower levels of mental health. Despite differences in identity or minoritized status, all respondents reported the same levels of stress and discrimination, which suggests that social support is the primary resource most useful in increasing levels of hopefulness. This is relevant due to the correlation found between higher levels of hope and a quicker rehabilitation from homelessness.

An integral consideration when discussing homelessness through an anthropological lens is the role of stigma and cultural bias, as these forces shape both public perception and the lived experiences of unhoused individuals. Stigma often produces a “snowball effect,” whereby negative stereotypes reinforce social exclusion, which in turn worsens health and wellbeing outcomes. Homelessness is frequently associated with physical and mental illness, a connection largely reinforced by political discourse and media portrayals. While rates of homelessness are closely tied to broader economic stability and structural inequality, dominant narratives frequently depict it as a result of individual failings such as laziness, irresponsibility, or mental incapacity. Such framings obscure the systemic drivers of homelessness and sustain discriminatory attitudes. Moreover, these representations contribute to the construction of homeless people as medical or public health risks, with their lifestyles portrayed as threats to community safety and personal wellbeing. Importantly, the effects of stigma are not uniform: homeless men are often stereotyped as dangerous or morally deficient, while homeless women are more likely to be characterised as pitiable or undesirable. These gendered perceptions reflect deeply rooted cultural prejudices and highlight how intersectional stigma reproduces social marginalisation.

== Discriminatory legislation and criminalization ==
Discriminatory legislation targets the activities and actions that many homeless people engage in, but due to the nature of these actions there have been questions of constitutional legitimacy in enforcing criminalization measures on the grounds that they are a violation of civil rights. Examples of discriminatory criminalization includes restricting permitted areas used for sitting or sleeping, restrictions on panhandling, forced removals from an area, destruction of property, overly vague loitering and vagrancy laws, limiting bathroom access, prohibiting dumpster diving, punishing asocial or antisocial behavior, and unequal enforcement of the law.

The criminalization of panhandling, destruction of property, and forced removal from public and private areas has been argued by opponents to be violations of the First Amendment's protection of free speech and unlawful search and seizure. An American Civil Liberties Union report cited the issues that arise from forced relocation in a report focusing on the city of Los Angeles, which pushed homeless individuals to remote locations near the desert, far away from available food, water, and crucial services. The criminalization of sleeping or camping in public and private areas was ruled as unconstitutional by the Ninth Circuit US Court of Appeals on the grounds that it is a violation of the Eighth Amendment's protection from cruel and unusual punishment. The reasoning behind this argument was that homeless people should not be punished as long as homeless people lack the facilities to conduct these acts privately.

In addition, despite Title VII of the Civil Rights Act of 1964 prohibiting employment discrimination, arguments have arisen over address requirements in job applications that can result in discrimination against homeless people. Since homeless individuals have no residence, they often list the address of homeless shelters in job applications and have subsequently reported being denied positions regardless of sufficient qualification and positive interview sessions before address disclosure. Ban the Address, a campaign that proposes that employers delay asking about an applicant's address until after the applicant is given a job offer, has been backed by advocates as a possible solution to the employment discrimination that homeless individuals encounter.

=== Anti-camping legislation ===
Anti-camping legislation prohibits a number of actions that target homeless people. The rules and regulations typically vary between municipalities, but some of the prohibited behaviors include sleeping on public or private property, setting up a tent or tent-like structure, or keeping property stored in unauthorized areas. The spaces where this behavior is prohibited can include parks, beaches, sidewalks, roads, under bridges, and other public and private areas.

Anti-camping legislation in municipalities has increased because of the 2024 Supreme Court ruling in Grants Pass v. Johnson, which states that the criminalization of homeless people sleeping in public areas or setting up encampments does not constitute as a violation of the Eighth Amendment. The repercussions of this ruling may include increased fining, arrests, and sudden relocations of individuals outside of city limits. Some of the concerns regarding this ruling include the threat of property loss during forced relocation, including personal phones, medication, and items of identification that can hinder prospects of future employment, housing, and safety if lost. People experiencing homelessness have also relayed their fear of increased inaccessibility of food, water, and other necessary goods and services due to restrictions of public and private land, and how this subsequently makes them feel socially outcast while simultaneously making job application and resource building more difficult due to the frequency of forced relocation.

==== Lack of access to public restrooms ====
According to the National Alliance to End Homelessness, there was a total of 553,742 homeless people accounted for across the United States as of January 2017. Of those accounted for, 192,875 of them were unsheltered and lived in inhumane and unsafe conditions. Many unsheltered homeless camps are located in industrial districts and along highways, far away from public parks facilities where traditional public bathrooms are located. If local municipalities do not provide bathroom access, homeless people are left to urinate and defecate in the streets and waterways near their camps.

The University of Colorado Denver released a report highlighting the criminalization of homelessness across the state of Colorado. The report found that 83% of the people interviewed said they were denied bathroom access because they were homeless. Without access to bathrooms, many unsheltered homeless people across the country are left to live in unsanitary conditions which, in turn, leads to public health concerns such as the hepatitis A outbreak in California during 2016–2018. A report in The New England Journal of Medicine found that 649 people in California were infected with hepatitis A in 2017, and that most of those affected were homeless.

===== Anti-homeless architecture =====
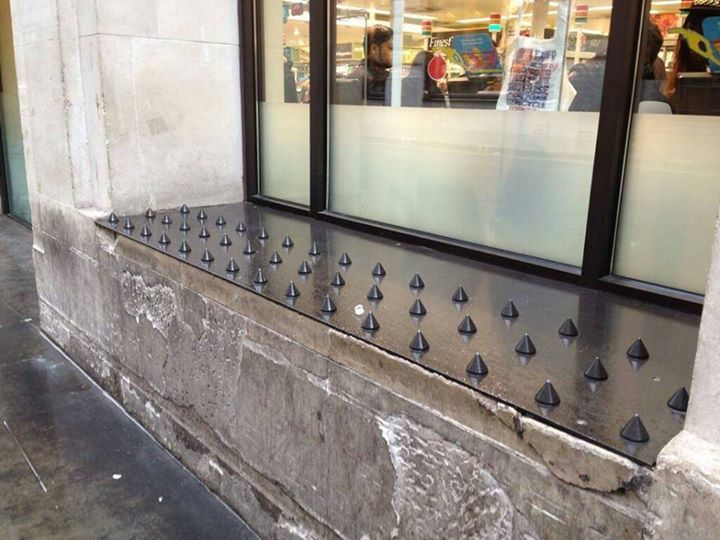
"Anti-homeless spikes" in front of a window

Some cities and towns have incorporated hostile architecture, also known as defensive architecture, to deter homeless people through the use of uncomfortable designs that prevent sitting or sleeping. These designs include spikes, segregated benches, and gated doorways. Research conducted by Crisis recorded that 35% of homeless people surveyed were unable to find a place to sleep as a result of the designs. In addition, a fifth of respondents reported experiencing other measures, such as intentionally disruptive sounds being played, to drive them out of area.

As of 2024, 256,610 people experiencing homelessness are unsheltered, largely due to the predicament that there are only enough beds to accommodate 53% of the homeless individuals who need them. This leaves many homeless people with no other option than to sleep outside, which is made more difficult and degrading by hostile architecture and noise pollution.

==== Stigmatising language ====
A 2025 study examined how stigma towards people experiencing homelessness is expressed through everyday language through analysing UK social media posts that were identified as stigmatising. The study found that such language was typically built around one or more of seven recurring themes: physical appearance and hygiene, perceived antisocial or threatening behaviour, dehumanisation (such as comparison to vermin), the attribution of homelessness to personal failings rather than structural causes, low social status, substance misuse, and general undesirability. Additionally, the study found that stigmatising language was not confined to direct discussions of homelessness; it occurred most frequently in jokes, comparisons, and passing remarks in which homelessness was not the central topic, which suggested that stigma is reinforced partly through causal, everyday speech rather than through explicit commentary alone.

== Hate crimes and violence ==
Homeless individuals are not covered under hate crime statues on a federal level in the United States, and there are very few studies that focus on the victimization of homeless individuals as a group. The majority of the existing literature and documentation of emotional or physical harm inflicted upon a homeless person due to their housing status has been compiled by the National Coalition for the Homeless (NCH), whose work in the area has inspired different state legislatures to incorporate homelessness as a protected category of their state's hate crime laws.

The NCH's repository lists roughly 2000 reported incidents of violence against homeless people and 588 murders over the past 23 years, however the true number of crimes committed against homeless people is hard to surmise due to the issue of underreporting. These crimes have allegedly been committed due to the victim's homelessness, or because some aggressors may view homeless people as vulnerable and easy to target. Evidence supporting this claim comes from neural imaging studies which revealed that participants responded to images of homeless individuals with contempt, disgust, and dehumanization; which indicates a partial explanation for the discrimination and hate crimes that homeless people are subjected to. A signification amount of resistance to homeless is based on their overwhelmingly disproportionate propensity to commit violent crime, particularly against strangers. Frequent cases of sexual assault, hate crimes, and littering also inspire resistance to the homeless.

Violent crimes against homeless people in other countries include the Ximending student feces-throwing incident in Taiwan.

== Health ==
Homeless youth, especially those from minority groups, have to deal with considerable mental health challenges, including depression, anxiety, and PTSD, which are further aggravated by experiences of discrimination, trauma, and lack of consistent housing. Many of these sociocultural barriers include limited access to insurance, discrimination in health care, and transportation issues, which have invariably barred many from accessing much-needed medical attention. Adopting the Housing First Initiative and trauma-informed care models as part of systems to reduce discrimination and increase access to services for homeless populations can be crucial to ensuring health improvement. Homeless individuals with a mental health issue or a substance use disorder are much more likely to find themselves with life-threatening conditions of the body and immediate conditions of the body and often live in dangerous situations. More than one out of ten populations seeking care for substance abuse or mental health in the public health system identify themselves as homeless.

=== Mental health amongst minority youth ===
Mental health issues are rampant among homeless people, especially among minority youths, because they suffer compounded effects from harmful living conditions, trauma, and discrimination from systems. According to Covenant House, approximately 50% of homeless youth have depression, anxiety, or PTSD as a result of stressful and traumatic conditions. A study conducted on homeless minority youths in Los Angeles found that the experience of racial and ethnic discrimination is very closely related to emotional distress like depression and anxiety. A study conducted in Canada regarding indigenous homeless youth also revealed that their major challenges in mental health are anxiety and depression with suicidal thoughts. It's important to underscore social interventions and community care in exposure to violence, food insecurity, and unstable family environments. This often becomes a vicious cycle that increasingly deteriorates mental health. Stress from homelessness can worsen existing conditions and initiate other problems.

Homeless persons may lack identification or access to transportation, making it difficult to provide them with mental health services. Almost all homeless persons do not seek mental health services because of discrimination and stigma found in healthcare in contrast to using those services, leaving untreated and, therefore, worsening conditions. Trauma-informed care is essential because it understands the ongoing effects of trauma while creating a safe, healing environment to counter these stresses. In addition, peer support in terms of social and racial factors promotes resilience through belonging and reduction of the destructive effects of discrimination. Programs designed with input from people who have lived experience prove effective in their successes of achieving better mental health outcomes and filling service gaps.

=== Healthcare disparities ===
Access to healthcare often acts as an obstacle to homeless people's efforts to achieve good health. Absences of insurance, transportation, or money leads to poor health condition outcomes. Most end up using emergency services and going through many hospital admissions for preventable conditions. To address such cases, California's Senate Bill 1152 was passed in 2018, which ended patient dumping, requiring hospitals to provide temporary housing support for homeless patients post-discharge, even though housing is still an issue at its core. One of its most hopeful solutions is the Housing First initiative, which rests on permanent and unconditional housing as a necessary foundation for improving health and stability. Studies show that Housing First decreases the costs of emergency services, hospitalizations, and Medicaid expenses while improving mental health and reducing substance use. However, its expansion has encountered political and financial roadblocks. Thus, it does not require just affordable housing but also policies that will ensure access to comprehensive healthcare without reservation.

Discrimination is one of the most prominent issues underlying the health inequalities experienced by homeless people while attempting to access healthcare services. It significantly hampers their capacity to obtain the medical assistance they deserve. The stigma that the homeless people often face and stereotyping can be a dehumanizing experience for them and can deter them from seeking medical attention altogether. Such an experience is pretty standard as many report being treated as if they have no worth by doctors or dispensaries, and this not only worsens their mental issues but also prevents them from seeking help in the future. Other than the absence of identification and transportation, which can be seen more as structural barriers, the barriers also include lack of insurance, which limits their ability to access viable health care options. Such impediments, combined with administrative barriers such as limited clinic operating hours and complicated intake procedures, frequently result in missed appointments or avoidance of care entirely. Furthermore, racial discrimination and ethnic bias also permeate many of these disparities; minority homeless people face even further disadvantages when trying to access adequate and appropriate healthcare. Consequently, any policies developed to address these concerns should not only be aimed at increasing housing availability but should also include measures to prevent discrimination in healthcare settings, such as anti-bias education for healthcare providers and improving access to healthcare.

== Media perceptions ==
=== Imagery ===
Discrimination towards people experiencing homelessness is influenced in part by the images used to portray homelessness in the media. Media representations frequently depict homelessness as involving older men sleeping rough on the streets for extended periods. In the United Kingdom, The Centre for Homelessness Impact maintains an online image library featuring more representative images of real people experiencing homelessness. The collection includes images of individuals living in temporary accommodation, sofa surfing, living in hostel accommodation and those experiencing street homelessness.

== See also ==
- Anti-homelessness legislation
- Aporophobia
- Black triangle (badge)
- Camden bench
- Class discrimination
- Consolidated Laws of New York
- Economic discrimination
- Economic inequality
- Homeless dumping
- Homelessness
- Hostile architecture
- Housing First
- Internally displaced person
- List of homelessness organizations
- Poverty
- Public housing
- Right to housing
- Skid row
- Social cleansing
- Vagrancy laws
