= Community Mental Health Act =

1963 American law

- Other short titles: Mental Retardation and Community Mental Health Centers Construction Act of 1963
- Long title: An Act to provide assistance in combating mental retardation through grants for construction of research centers and grants for facilities for the mentally retarded and assistance in improving mental health through grants for construction of community mental health centers, and for other purposes.
- Nicknames: Community Mental Health Act of 1963
- Enacted by: the 88th United States Congress
- Effective: October 31, 1963

Citations
- Public law: 88-164
- Statutes at Large: 77 Stat. 282

Codification
- Titles amended: 42 U.S.C.: Public Health and Social Welfare
- U.S.C. sections created: 42 U.S.C. ch. 33, subch. I §§ 2661-2666; 42 U.S.C. ch. 33, subch. II §§ 2670-2677c; 42 U.S.C. ch. 33, subch. IIA §§ 2678-2678d; 42 U.S.C. ch. 33, subch. III §§ 2681-2688j-1, 2688j-2, 2688k-2688o, 2688p, 2688q-2688v, 2689-2689e, 2689f-2689h, 2689i-2689l, 2689m, 2689n-2689p, 2689q, 2689r-2689aa; 42 U.S.C. ch. 33, subch. IV §§ 2691, 2692, 2693-2697b; 42 U.S.C. ch. 33, subch. V §§ 2698-2698b

Legislative history
- Introduced in the Senate as S. 1576 by J. Lister Hill (D–AL) on May 21, 1963; Committee consideration by Senate Labor and Public Welfare, House Interstate and foreign Commerce; Passed the Senate on May 27, 1963 (72-1); Passed the House on September 10, 1963 (335-18); Reported by the joint conference committee on October 21, 1963; agreed to by the Senate on October 21, 1963 (agreed) and by the House on October 21, 1963 (299-13); Signed into law by President John F. Kennedy on October 31, 1963

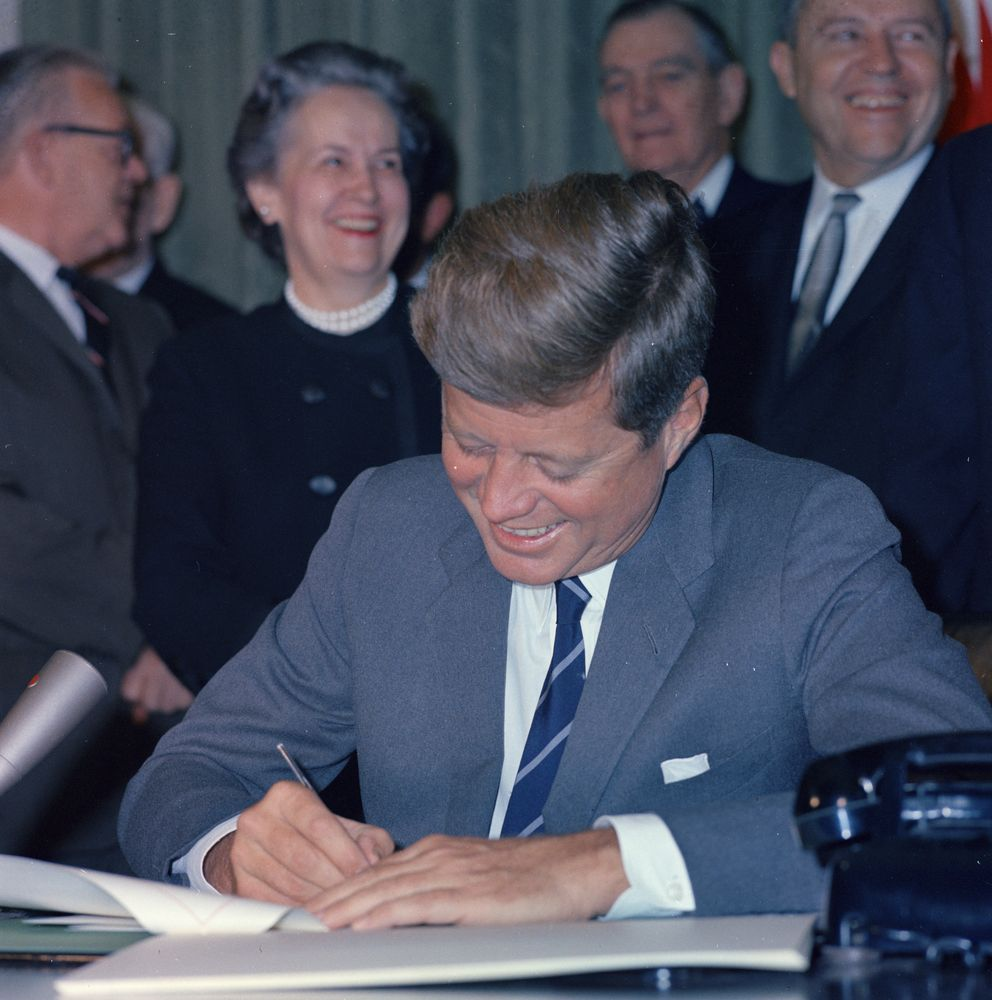
President John F. Kennedy signing the act

The Community Mental Health Act of 1963 (CMHA) (also known as the Community Mental Health Centers Construction Act, Mental Retardation Facilities and Construction Act, Public Law 88-164, or the Mental Retardation and Community Mental Health Centers Construction Act of 1963) was an act to provide federal funding for community mental health centers and research facilities in the United States. This legislation was passed as part of John F. Kennedy's New Frontier. It led to considerable deinstitutionalization.

In 1955, Congress passed the Mental Health Study Act, leading to the establishment of the Joint Commission on Mental Illness and Mental Health. That Commission issued a report in 1961, which would become the basis of the 1963 Act.

The CMHA provided grants to states for the establishment of local mental health centers, under the overview of the National Institute of Mental Health. The NIH also conducted a study involving adequacy in mental health issues. The purpose of the CMHA was to build mental health centers to provide for community-based care, as an alternative to institutionalization. At the centers, patients could be treated while working and living at home.

Only half of the proposed centers were ever built; none was fully funded, and the act didn't provide money to operate them long-term. Some states closed expensive state hospitals, but never spent money to establish community-based care. Deinstitutionalization accelerated after the adoption of Medicaid in 1965. During the Reagan administration, the remaining funding for the act was converted into a mental-health block grants for states. Since the CMHA was enacted, 90 percent of beds have been cut at state hospitals, but they have not been replaced by community resources.

The CMHA proved to be a mixed success. Many patients, formerly warehoused in institutions, were released into the community. However, not all communities have had the facilities or expertise to deal with them. In many cases, patients wound up in adult homes or with their families, or homeless in large cities, and without the mental health care they needed. Without community support, mentally ill people have more trouble getting treatment, maintaining medication regimens, and supporting themselves. They make up a large proportion of the homeless and an increasing proportion of people in jail.

== See also ==
- Community mental health service
- Psychiatric hospital
- Involuntary commitment
- Outpatient commitment
- Treatment Advocacy Center
- Political abuse of psychiatry
- Global Mental Health
