= Homelessness and mental health =

A study in Western societies found mental illness, alcoholism, and drug dependency to be more prevalent among homeless people than among the general population. A 2009 US study estimated that 20–25% of homeless people, compared with 6% of the non-homeless, have severe mental illness. Other estimates vary. One 2003 study out of California suggests that 20-40% of the homeless have a severe mental illness. A 2024 systematic review and meta-analysis by JAMA (the Journal of the American Medical Association), consisting principally of Canadian, German, and American studies, found that 67% of the unhoused had a mental health disorder, with a 77% lifetime mental health disorder prevalence among those who are or have been homeless.

In January 2015, the most extensive survey ever undertaken found 564,708 people were homeless on a given night in the United States. Depending on the age group in question and how homelessness is defined, the consensus estimate as of 2014 was that, at any given time, 45% of the American homeless—250,000 individuals—were mentally ill and that at least 25% of the homeless—140,000 individuals—were seriously mentally ill, with even higher numbers if these were annual counts rather than point-in-time counts.

Being chronically homeless also means that people with mental illnesses are more likely to experience catastrophic health crises requiring medical intervention or resulting in institutionalization in the criminal justice system. Though most homeless people do not have a mental illness, those facing homelessness are struggling with psychological and emotional distress. The Substance Abuse and Mental Health Services Administration found that, in 2010, 26.2 percent of sheltered homeless people had a severe mental illness.

Research across seven western countries, including the United Kingdom, found that people in emergency accommodation, predominately ment in shelters and hostels, experience diagnosable mental health conditions at a far higher rate than the general population of the same age. Estimate rates include psychotic illness (12.7%), major depression (11.4%) and personality disorder (23.1%). A Scottish study found that people experiencing homelessness are admitted to mental health services at almost five times the rate of people living in the most deprived areas and twenty times the rate of people in least deprived areas.

Studies have found that there is a correlation between homelessness and incarceration. Those with mental illness or substance abuse problems were found to be incarcerated more often than the general population. Fischer and Breakey have identified the chronically mentally ill as one of the four main subtypes of homeless persons, the others being street people, chronic alcoholics, and the situationally distressed.

The first documented case of a psychiatrist addressing the issue of homelessness and mental health was that of Karl Wilmanns in 1996.

== Historical context ==
=== United States ===
In the United States, there are broad patterns of reform within the history of psychiatric care for persons with mental illness. These patterns are currently categorized into three major cycles of reform. The first recognized cycle was the emergence of moral treatment and asylums, the second consists of the mental hygiene movement and the psychopathic (state) hospital, and most recent cycle includes deinstitutionalization and community mental health.

In a 1986 article addressing the historical developments and reforms of treatment for the mentally ill, Joseph Morrissey and Howard Goldman acknowledged the current regression of public social welfare for mentally ill populations. They specifically state that the "historical forces that led to the transinstitutionalization of the mentally ill from almshouses to the state mental hospitals in the nineteenth and twentieth centuries have now been reversed in the aftermath of recent deinstitutionalization policies".

==== Asylums ====
Within the context of transforming schemas of moral treatment during the early nineteenth century, the humanitarian focus of public intervention was linked with the establishment of asylums or snake pits for treatment of the mentally ill. The ideology that emerged in Europe disseminated to America, in the form of a social reformation based on the belief that new cases of insanity could be treated by isolating the ill into "small, pastoral asylums" for humane treatment. These asylums were meant to combine medical attention, occupational therapy, socialization activities and religious support, all in a warm environment.

In America, Friends Asylum (1817) and the Hartford Retreat (1824) were among the first asylums within the private sector, yet public asylums were soon encouraged, with Dorothea Dix as one of its key lobbyists. The effectiveness of asylums was dependent on a collection of structural and external conditions, conditions that proponents began to recognize were unfeasible to maintain around the mid-nineteenth century. For example, with the proliferation of immigrants throughout industrialization, the original purpose of asylums as small facilities transformed into their actualized use as "large, custodial institutions" throughout the late 1840s. Overcrowding severely inhibited the therapeutic capacity, inciting a political reassessment period about alternatives to asylums around the 1870s. The legislative purpose of state asylums soon met the role society had funneled them toward; they primarily became institutions for community protection, with treatment secondary.

==== Deinstitutionalization ====
Toward the end of World War II, the influx of soldiers diagnosed with "war neurosis" incited a new public interest in community care. In addition to this, the view that asylums and state hospitals exacerbated symptoms of mental illness by being "inherently dehumanizing and antitherapeutic" spread through the public consciousness. When psychiatric drugs like neuroleptics stabilized behavior and milieu therapy proved effective, state hospitals began discharging patients, with hope that federal programs and community support would counterbalance the effects of institutionalization. Furthermore, economic responsibility for disabled people began to shift, as religious and non-profit organization assumed the role of supplying basic needs. The modern results of deinstitutionalization show the dissonance between policy expectations and the actualized reality.

==== Community mental health centers ====
In response to the flaws of deinstitutionalization, a reform movement reframed the context of the chronically mentally ill within the lens of public health and social welfare problems. Policy makers intentionally circumvented state mental hospitals by allocating federal funds directly to local agencies. For example, the Community Mental Health Centers (CMHC) Act of 1963 became law, "which funded the construction and staffing of hundreds of federal centers to provide a range of services including partial hospitalization, emergency care, consultation, and treatment." Despite efforts, newly founded community centers "failed to meet the needs of acute and chronic patients discharged in increasing numbers from public hospitals".

With decreased state collaboration and federal funding for social welfare, community centers essentially proved unable "to provide many essential programs and benefits", resulting in a growth of homelessness and indigency, or lack of access to basic necessities. It is argued that an over reliance on community health has "left thousands of former patients homeless or living in substandard housing, often without treatment, supervision or social support."

==== State mental hospitals ====
As debates regarding the deteriorating role of American asylums and psychiatry amplified around the turn of the century, new reformation arose. With the founding of the National Committee for Mental Hygiene, acute treatment centers like psychopathic hospitals, psychiatric dispensaries and child guidance clinics were created. Beginning with the State Care Act in New York, states began assuming full financial control for the mentally ill, in an effort to compensate for the deprivations of asylums. Between 1903 and 1950, the number of patients in state mental hospitals went from 150,000 to 512,000. Morrissey recognizes that despite persistent problem of chronic mental illness, these state mental hospitals were able to provide a minimal level of care.

United States president John F. Kennedy signed the Community Mental Health Act that was put in place to give funding for community-based facilities rather than having patients going to state hospitals. Decades later, once the Community Mental Health Act was implemented a lot of state hospitals suffered and were on the verge of forced to close which pushed patients to the community-based facilities. The closures of the state hospitals lead to an overcrowding in the community facilities and there was a lack of support, which lead to patients not having access to the medical help they needed.

== Personal factors ==
=== Mental illness ===
The mental health of homeless populations is significantly worse than the general population, with the prevalence of mental disorders up to four times higher in the former. It is also found that psychopathology and substance abuse often exist before the onset of homelessness, supporting the finding that mental disorders are a strong risk factor for homelessness. Ongoing issues with mental disorders such as affective and anxiety disorders, substance abuse and schizophrenia are elevated for the homeless.

One explanation for homelessness states that "mental illness or alcohol and drug abuse render individuals unable to maintain permanent housing." A 2002 study states that 10–20 percent of homeless populations have a dual diagnoses, or the co-existence of substance abuse and of another severe mental disorder. For example, in Germany there is a link between alcohol dependence and schizophrenia with homeless populations.

=== Trauma ===
There are patterns of biographical experience that are linked with subsequent mental health problems and pathways into homelessness. Martens states that reported childhood experiences, described as "feeling unloved in childhood, adverse childhood experiences, and general unhappiness in childhood" seem to become "powerful risk factors" for adult homelessness. For example, Martens emphasizes the salient dimension of familial and residential instability, as he describes the prevalence of foster-care or group home placement for homeless adolescents. He notes that "58 percent of homeless adolescents had experienced some kind of out-of-home placement, running away, or early departure from home."

Up to 50 percent of homeless adolescents report experience with physical abuse, and almost one-third report sexual abuse. In addition to family conflict and abuse, early exposure to factors like poverty, housing instability, and alcohol and drug use all increase one's vulnerability to homelessness. Once impoverished, the social dimension of homelessness manifests from "long exposure to demoralizing relationships and unequal opportunities."

=== Trauma and homeless youth ===
Youth experiencing homelessness are more susceptible to developing post-traumatic stress disorder (PTSD). Common psychological traumas experienced by homeless youth include, sexual victimization, neglect, experiences of violence, and abuse. A 2019 article published by the Homeless Policy Research Institute notes that homeless youth are subjected to many different forms of trauma. A study was done and found that 80% of youth that experienced homelessness in Los Angeles suffered at least one traumatic experience. Another study was conducted in Canada that showed a more severe statistic that Canadian homeless youth have been through 11 to 12 traumatic experiences.

While trauma is prevalent in homeless youth, it is not uncommon for an adolescent to experience an increase of trauma after they experience homelessness. The LGBTQ community represents 20% of the homeless US youth population. The reason for this high percentage is due to the issues and/or rejection from their family due to the sexual orientation.

== Societal factors ==
Draine et al. emphasize the role of social disadvantage with manifestations of mental illness. He states that "research on mental illness in relation to social problems such as crime, unemployment, and homelessness often ignores the broader social context in which mental illness is embedded."

=== Social barriers ===
==== Stigma ====
Lee argues that societal conceptualizations of homelessness and poverty can be juxtaposed, leading to different manifestations of public stigma. In his work through national and local surveys, respondents tended to deemphasize individual deficits over "structural forces and bad luck" for homeless individuals. In contrast, the respondents tended to associate personal failures more to the impoverished than homeless individuals.

Nonetheless, homeless individuals are "well aware of the negative traits imputed to them – lazy, filthy, irresponsible dangerous – based on the homeless label." In an effort to cope with the emotional threat of stigma, homeless individuals may rely on one another for "non-judgmental socializing". However, his work continues to emphasize that the mentally ill homeless are often deprived of social networks like this.

Mejia-Lancheros et al. reveal that challenges such as mental health-related discrimination and stigma make it hard for homeless people to find a home, become a part of communities, and heal their mental health problems. To care for homeless people, whether that is at a personal level or a much larger scale such as social structures, stigma and discrimination need to be considered.

==== Social isolation ====
People who are homeless tend to be socially isolated, which contributes negatively to their mental health. Studies have correlated that those who are homeless and have a strong support group tend to be more physically and mentally healthy. Aside from the stigma received by the homeless population, another aspect that contributes to social isolation is the purposeful avoidance of social opportunity practiced by the homeless community out of shame of revealing their current homeless state. Social isolation ties directly to social stigma in that homeless socialization outside of the homeless community will affect how the homeless are perceived. This is why homeless individuals talking with those who are not homeless is encouraged since it can combat the stigma that is often associated with homelessness.

Lachaud et al. (2024) reveal that social isolation and loneliness are prevalent issues for those experiencing homelessness. Healthcare providers are not properly trained to see it as a health issue, and creating policies would be useful as it would support people experiencing homelessness.

==== Racial inequality ====
One dimension of the American homeless is the skewed proportion of minorities. In a sample taken from Los Angeles, 68 percent of the homeless men were African American. In contrast, the Netherlands sample had 42 percent Dutch homeless, with 58 percent of the homeless population in the Netherlands being from other nationalities. Lee notes that minorities have a heightened risk of the "repeated exit-and-entry pattern"

Jones (2016) revealed the way that race and previous incarceration play a role in the likelihood of becoming homeless, with non-white homeless people being more likely to have been arrested previously than white people. Another point that can lead to this skew is that most homeless people are men, and "... black men are six times as likely to be incarcerated as white men"

Gender differences

Bretherton (2017) revealed that in Europe, women's homelessness does not always receive recognition through the means of research, which has the potential to skew data relating to gender differences among homeless individuals. When women become homeless because of male violence they are seen as "victims of domestic violence" which can affect the way gender is represented in research on homelessness. In European countries where homelessness is much less prevalent, although women could be facing hidden homelessness, factors such as mental illness, drug and alcohol use, problems in childhood, and criminal history may be more prevalent than gender in affecting homelessness.

Lurie et al. (2015) reveal that in the United States, domestic violence is a significant reason that women and children face homelessness. There may be fewer options for finding shelter because of the need to not be traced and the mental abuse of isolation that can make finding resources difficult. Another problem is little protection in housing discrimination for women, for example, landlords can discriminate based on any crime, meaning a woman can be denied housing whether they are a perpetrator or victim.

Montgomery et al. (2017) reveal information on gender within the United States, while mental health problems may be less common in men, they increase the odds of homelessness. In attempting to lessen unsheltered homelessness in men paying attention to mental health is important. For both homeless women and men, addressing trauma and care is important in preventing premature mortality.

Disability inequality

Beer et al. (2019) revealed that Australia has had an unaffordable housing market that does not make room for support that people with disabilities need, which leaves them vulnerable to becoming homeless. A notable fact about Homelessness in Australia, "persons with a disability had greater exposure to the risk of homelessness than the general population" There are similar levels of risk of homelessness between those with a physical disability and those without a disability. However, those with learning and understanding disabilities have around a 25% chance of extreme homelessness risk, compared to 16% of those without that disability. For those with mental illness who require help, there is a 34% chance of extreme homelessness risk, compared to 17% of individuals without that disability.

Rodrigue (2016) reveals that in Canada, 6% of people who had no disability reported that they had experienced hidden homelessness and that those who had one disability were at a rate of 11% of reporting. People who have more than one type of disability face even higher levels of hidden homelessness than they report, with those with two disabilities having an 18% chance of reporting and those who have three or more disabilities being at 26% of reporting experiencing hidden homelessness.

=== Institutional barriers ===
Shinn and Gillespie (1994) argued that although substance abuse and mental illness is a contributing factor to homelessness, the primary cause is the lack of low-income housing. Elliot and Krivo emphasize the structural conditions that increase vulnerability to homelessness. Within their study, these factors are specifically categorized into "unavailable low-cost housing, high poverty, poor economic conditions, and insufficient community and institutional support for the mentally ill."

Through their correlational analysis, they reinforce the finding that areas with more spending on mental health care have "notably lower levels of homelessness." Their findings emphasize that among the analyzed correlates, "per capita expenditures on mental health care, and the supply of low-rent housing are by far the strongest predictors of homelessness rates." Along with economic hardship, patterns of academic underachievement also undermine an individual's opportunity for reintegration into general society, which heightens their risk for homelessness.

On a psychological level, Lee notes that the "stressful nature of hard times (high unemployment, a tight housing market, etc.) helps generate personal vulnerabilities and magnifies their consequences." For example, poverty is a key determinant of the relationship between debilitating mental illness and social maladjustment; it is associated with decreased self-efficacy and coping. Poverty is an important predictor of life outcomes, such as "quality of life, social and occupational functioning, general health and psychiatric symptoms", all relevant aspects of societal stability. Thus, systemic factors tend to compound mental instability for the homeless. Tackling homelessness involves focusing on the risk factors that contribute to homelessness as well as advocating for structural change.

== Consequences ==
=== Incarceration ===
It is argued that persons with mental illness are more likely than others to be arrested, owing to a higher risk of other factors associated with incarceration, such as substance abuse, unemployment, and lack of formal education. Furthermore, when correctional facilities lack adequate coordination with community resources upon release, the chances of recidivism increase for persons who are both homeless and mentally ill. Every state in the United States incarcerates more individuals with severe mental illness than it hospitalizes. Incarcerations are due to lack of treatments such as psychiatric hospital beds.

In 2013, according to Raphael and Stoll, over 60 percent of United States jail inmates report mental health problems. Estimates from the Survey of Inmates in State and Federal Correctional Facilities (2004) and the Survey of Inmates in Local Jails (2002) report that the prevalence for severe mental illness (the psychoses and bipolar/manic-depressive disorders) is 3.1–6.5 times the rate observed for the general population.

In relation to homelessness, it is found that 17.3 percent of inmates with severe mental illness experienced a homeless state before their incarceration, compared to 6.5 percent of undiagnosed inmates. The authors argue that a significant portion of deinstitutionalized mentally ill were transitioned into correctional facilities, by specifically stating that "transinstitutional effect estimates suggest that deinstitutionalization has played a relatively minor role in explaining the phenomenal growth in U.S. incarceration levels."

== Responses ==
Responses to mental health and homelessness include measures focused on housing and mental health services. Providers face challenges in the form of community adversity.

=== Housing ===
Modern efforts to reduce homelessness include "housing-first models", where individuals and families are placed in permanent homes with optional wrap-around services. This effort is less expensive than the cost of institutions that serve the complex needs of people experiencing homeless, such as emergency shelters, mental hospitals and jails. The alternative approach of housing first has shown positive outcomes. A 2013 study reports an 88 percent housing retention rate for those in Housing First, compared to 47 percent using traditional programs.

A review of permanent supportive housing and case management on health found that interventions using "housing-first models" can improve health outcomes among chronically homeless individuals, many of whom have substance use disorders and severe mental illness. Improvements include positive changes in self-reported mental health status, substance use, and overall well-being. These models can also help reduce hospital admissions, length of stay in inpatient psychiatric units, and emergency room visits.

There is a new intervention called "Permanent Supportive Housing" that was designed help independent living and help with employment and health care. 407,966 individuals were homeless in shelters, transitional housing programs, or on the streets. Those with mental illnesses have difficulty not only with their current housing issues, but have issues with housing if they get evicted. Youth can benefit from permanent housing, increases social activity, and improve mental health. Federally funded rental assistance are in place, but due to the high demand of the funds, the government is unable to keep up.

A 2013 study evaluating the efficacy of the Housing First model followed mentally ill homeless individuals with criminal records over a two-year period, and after being placed in the Housing First program only 30% re-offended. Overall results of the study showed a large reduction in re-conviction, increased public safety, and a reduction in crime rates. A significant decline in drug use was also seen with the implementation of the Housing First model. The study showed a 50% increase in housing retention and a 30% increase in methadone treatment retention in program participants.

=== Mental health services ===
Uninterrupted assistance greatly increases the chances of living independently and greatly reduces the chances of homelessness and incarceration. Through longitudinal comparisons of sheltered homeless families and impoverished domiciled families, there are a collection of social buffers that slow one's trajectory toward homelessness. A number of these factors include "entitlement income, a housing subsidy, and contact with a social worker." These social buffers can also be effective in supporting individuals exiting homelessness.

A 2015 study utilizing Maslow's hierarchy of needs in assessing housing experiences of adults with mental illnesses found a complex relationship between basic needs, self-actualization, goal setting, and mental health. Meeting self-actualization needs are vital to mental health and treatment of mental illness. Housing, stable income, and social connectedness are basic needs, and when met can lead to fulfillment of higher needs and improved mental health. Those with a brief history of homelessness and managed disabilities may have better access to housing.

Research calls for evidence based remediation practices that transform mental health care into a recovery oriented system. The following list includes practices currently being utilized to address the mental health needs of homeless individuals:

- Integrated service system, between and within agencies in policy making, funding, governance and service delivery.
- Low barrier housing with support services.
- Building Assertive Community Teams (ACT) and Forensic Assertive Community Teams (FACT).
- Assisted Community Treatment (ACT).
- Outreach services that identify and connect homeless to the social service system and help navigate the complex, fragmented web of services.

=== Challenges ===
Fear surrounds the introduction of mentally ill homeless housing and treatment centers into neighborhoods, due to existing stereotypes that homeless individuals are often associated with increased drug use and criminal activity. The Housing First Model study, along with other studies, show that this is not necessarily the case. Proponents of the NIMBY (not-in-my-backyard) movement have played an active role in the challenges faced by housing and mental health service interventions for the homeless.

Further research is necessary to thoroughly understand the links between poor mental health and homelessness to make sure that it is handled more effectively.

== Suicide ==
Data from 36,127 adults in the National Epidemiologic Survey on Alcohol and Related Conditions-III in the U.S. stated that 21% of those that had experienced homelessness in the past year had made a past-year suicide attempt.

In the UK, homeless people are over nine times more likely to take their own life than the general population.

== See also ==
- Healthy building
- Mental environment
- Right to housing
- Socioeconomic status and mental health
