= Patient dumping =

Inappropriately releasing homeless or indigent patients

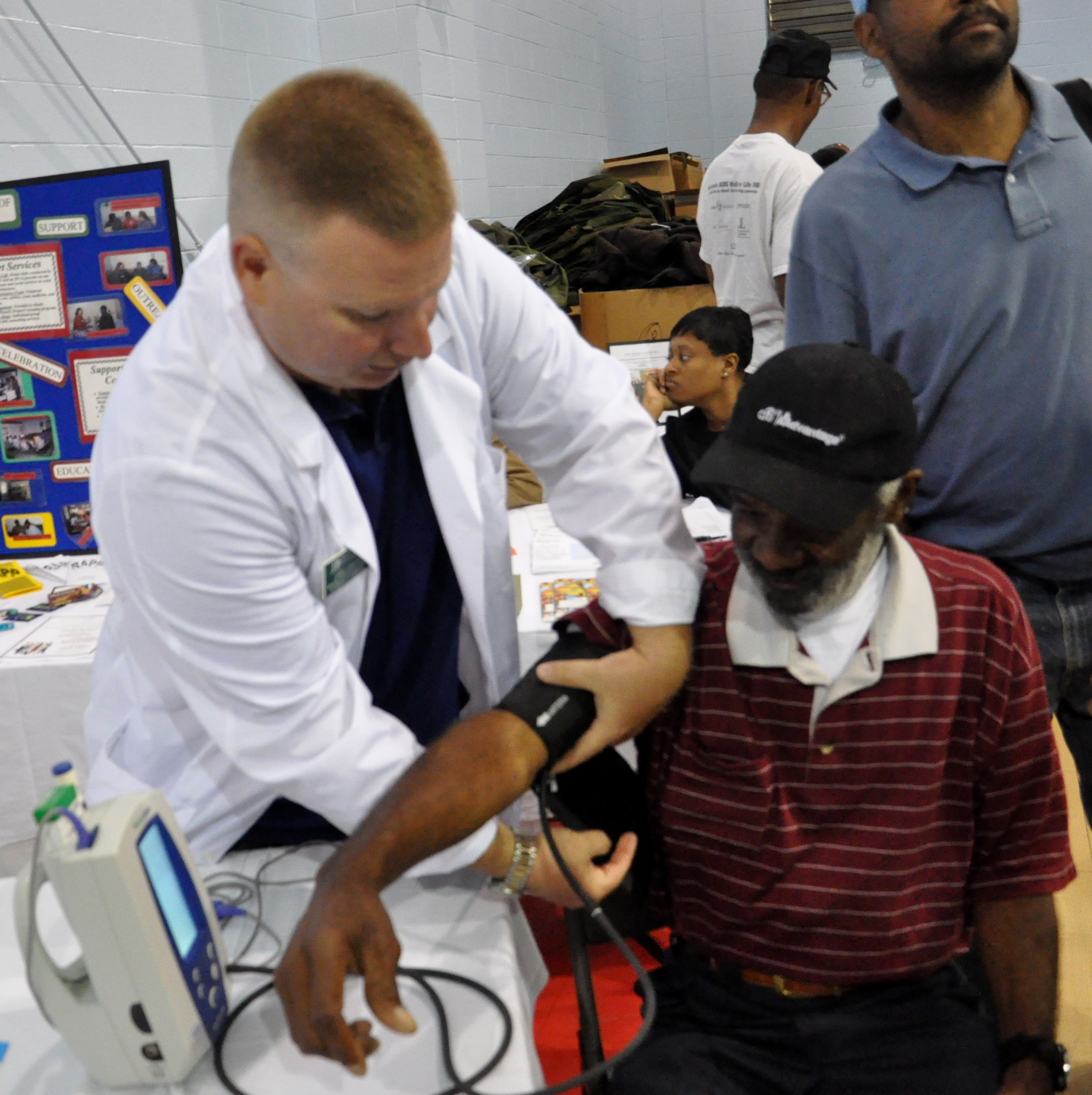
A homeless veteran receives medical treatment. Homeless patients are one of the groups who are especially vulnerable to patient dumping.

Patient dumping or homeless dumping is the practice of hospitals (typically private hospitals) and emergency services transferring homeless or indigent patients to public hospitals or discharging them onto the streets instead of transferring them to a homeless shelter or retaining them. These cases usually require expensive medical care with minimal government reimbursement. The term "homeless dumping" has been used since the late 19th century and resurfaced throughout the 20th century alongside legislation and policy changes aimed at addressing the issue. Studies of the issue indicate mixed results from the United States' policy interventions and propose a variety of ideas to remedy the problem.

== History ==
=== Early history ===
The term "patient dumping" was first mentioned in several New York Times articles published in the late 1870s that described the practice of private New York hospitals transporting poor and sickly patients by horse-drawn ambulance to Bellevue Hospital, the city's preeminent public facility. The jarring ride and lack of stabilized care typically resulted in death of the patient and outrage of the public. Scholars report that private hospital administrations were motivated by a desire to keep mortality rates and costs down when they advised ambulance drivers to send poor patients in critical condition directly to public hospitals like Bellevue even if a private hospital was closer.

After the deaths associated with patient dumping or patient transfer added up, the first attempt at legislative reform in the United States was pushed through the New York Senate around 1907, largely by Julius Harburger. That legislation penalized private hospitals when they sent ill patients away or obligated staff to transfer them to another hospital. Notwithstanding the passage of city ordinances prohibiting the practice, it continued.

The practice of patient dumping continued for several decades, and in the 1960s, it was brought back into the public eye by the media, but not much was done to resolve the issue. Many homeless people who have mental health problems can no longer find a place in a psychiatric hospital because of the trend towards mental health deinstitutionalization from the 1960s onwards. It continues to this day especially in New York City, where Bellevue receives a large share of Manhattan's indigent population.

=== 1980s resurface in the public eye and policy interventions ===
"Patient dumping" resurfaced in the 1980s, nationwide, with private hospitals refusing to examine or treat the poor and uninsured in the emergency departments (ED) and transferring them to public hospitals for further care and treatment. In 1987, 33 complaints of patient dumping were made to the United States Department of Health and Human Services, and the following year 1988, 185 complaints were made. Since private hospitals ceased publishing their mortality rates, analysts pointed to high costs of dealing with Medicaid's reimbursements and uninsured patients as the motivation.

This refusal of care resulted in patient deaths and public outcry culminating with the passage of a federal anti-patient dumping law in 1986 known as the Emergency Medical Treatment and Active Labor Act (EMTALA). In 1985 the Consolidated Omnibus Budget Reconciliation Act (COBRA) was passed that was meant to regulate how patients were transferred and also end patient dumping. COBRA was not a complete solution, and in the years after its passage, hospitals struggled with creating appropriate discharge protocols and the cost of providing health care for homeless patients.

Statistically, Texas and Illinois had the highest rates of patient dumping because of economic difficulties. Researchers have reported that the language in COBRA was not precise enough to significantly disincentivize healthcare providers to discontinue patient dumping practices. For example, in the 1980s Texas state law had a loophole that allowed hospitals to transfer patients to nursing homes.

=== Early 21st century policy ===
In the 21st century, patient dumping continues to be a problem. University of California Los Angeles professor Emily Abel (2011) claimed that these policy interventions have not been effective because the United States' health care system is too heavily influenced by the patients' ability to pay. In the early 21st century, undocumented immigrants were reportedly subject to patient dumping by being deported or repatriated.

Research articles also describe dumping of homeless individuals and mentally ill individuals by police as another form of inappropriately shifting people from one area of a city to another instead of taking them to care facilities like shelters. In September 2014, the United States Commission on Civil Rights issued a report entitled "Patient Dumping".

== Statistics ==
A 2001 study by the Public Citizen's Health Research Group stated that there were widespread violations of EMTALA throughout the United States in 527 hospitals. Between 2005 and 2014 another study reported 43% of the US hospitals studied had been under EMTALA investigation that resulted in citations for 27% of the hospitals. The other findings of this study were that the number of EMTALA violations have been decreasing for the period between 2005 and 2014, and that the majority of the citations were given to hospitals for issues with policy enforcement. However, there is not a consensus among researchers about how to effectively measure the effects of EMTALA at reducing patient dumping or improving patient care.

== Associated factors ==
Patients living in poverty or in homelessness are often seen as less than ideal patients for hospital administrations because they are unlikely to be able to pay for their healthcare and tend to be hospitalized with severe illness. Other factors associated with patient dumping are being part of a minority group and being uninsured. Historically, hospitals have been reported to compete against each other to maintain low mortality rates at the expense of low-income patients. Competition within hospitals to see more patients and faster also increases the rate of inappropriate patient discharges.

Some researchers and scholars trace the issue of homeless dumping to the issue of homelessness and claim that addressing the issues of homelessness will prevent patient dumping. The increase of homelessness and poverty rates increases the number of people who are unable to pay for consistent healthcare which leads to emergency hospitalization of patients with exacerbated medical conditions. Social factors have allowed homelessness and poverty rates to further increase, and deinstitutionalization has led to psychiatric patients to lose access to services and be dumped on the streets.

== Intervention strategies ==
While the introduction of Medicaid and Medicare helped hospitals shoulder the burden of providing care to poverty-level and elderly patients, many people in the United States without health insurance were still vulnerable to inappropriate patient transfer or dumping. Scholars and researchers point to these patients' lack of access to preventative and consistent healthcare treatment, as well as inappropriate discharge procedures and follow-up protocols, as the causes behind their frequent rehospitalization.

In 1985 Illinois developed the Illinois Competitive Access and Reimbursement Equity (ICARE) program. It had adverse effects such as disrupting indigent patient's continuity of care, losing patients, and creating two hospital systems: one for uninsured lower-income patients and one for insured higher-income patients. The ICARE policy had a negative impact on the quality of healthcare that low-income and homeless patients received because it created disjointed treatment experiences when hospitals met their allocated funding quota and transferred patients to (or dumped patients on) other hospitals that still had funding and public hospitals. Proponents of the ICARE policy cited the reduction in Illinois' Medicare expenditure as evidence of the policy's success.

The 1986 Emergency Medical Treatment and Active Labor Act (EMTALA) was meant to regulate Medicare-participating hospitals and ensure that patients received appropriate medical treatment regardless of their ability to pay. Some scholars described how EMTALA provided a means to take legal action against healthcare providers and hospitals that did not comply, and provided examples of cases in Florida, California, and North Carolina. Even though hospitals have had to pay penalties, patient dumping remained an issue throughout the country.

In 2009 legal scholars Jeffrey Kahntroff and Rochelle Watson reported that the implementation of EMTALA has been flawed with issues of lack of adherence and confusion on how to comply. A study that looked at 5,594 hospitals in the United States between 2005 and 2014 reported that the number of EMTALA investigations has decreased through that period, which may be an indication that hospitals and physicians are improving their adherence to EMTALA protocols. The decrease in EMTALA investigations might also indicate that patient access to emergency care and treatment is improving. Researchers also interviewed doctors who reported that EMTALA citation fines were a disincentive to violate EMTALA protocols.

In 1988 Consolidated Omnibus Budget Reconciliation Act (COBRA) was meant to be a series of revised regulations which required hospital emergency rooms to treat every patient that walked through the door and doubled the fine for violations. News editor for the American Journal of Nursing, Patricia Brider, reported that public hospital staff in Illinois were under a lot of pressure due to the influx of patients that were being sent to them from other hospitals, and that the incidence of patient transfers or patient dumping increased through a loophole in COBRA.

The incentives offered to doctors in terms of payment for their services have an effect on patient care outcomes and can minimize the chances of patient dumping or shifting patients to other providers. A study conducted on doctors at the Fairview Health Services hospital in Minnesota reported that grouping doctors into teams to incentivize collaboration provided high quality health care for the patient. However, doctors who outperformed other doctors on their teams did not like the program because it did not incentivize underperforming doctors to improve. Some of the doctors interviewed in the study claimed that underperforming doctors would only start providing better care if their pay was affected by their lower quality services.

=== Discussion of intervention strategies ===
Some researchers and scholars have concluded that despite the policy interventions of the 1980s, the practice of patient dumping continued to be a problem in the United States and that a solution required a reformation of the entire healthcare system. These researchers shared the opinion that the most effective solution to address the health care needs of people living in poverty and those who are homeless is to provide universal healthcare because that would eliminate hospitals' incentives to turn patients away based on their ability to pay for services.

Other researchers emphasize that better-developed protocols and procedures for patient discharge are one of the most important strategies to reduce rehospitalization rates since patients living in homelessness and poverty lack the appropriate dwelling to continue the recuperation process. Another strategy to minimize rehospitalization rates proposed by researchers is to create recuperation programs for patients who lack access to one after they are discharged. Respite programs can be especially helpful for homeless patients to have safe places to recuperate and stop the cycle of chronic re-admittance. A 2015 study conducted using information about homeless patients in New Haven, Connecticut, reported that homeless patients had a 22% higher hospital readmittance rate than patients with insurance.

Regional or community-wide programs to oversee under-resourced patient recuperation or respite care seem to be the most sustainable because they pool resources from multiple hospitals and a larger population to provide appropriate recuperation facilities and minimize the risk of any one hospital or healthcare facility from having to provide the majority of the resources and cost associated with the increase of patients from the area's underserved patient population. Researchers say that the cost of rehospitalizing patients for more critical conditions is higher than the cost of providing appropriate healthcare and following careful patient discharge procedures, which in some cases are beyond the requirements outlined by policies like the EMTALA.

However, there are studies that have indicated that hospitals sometimes face delays when discharging a homeless patient because they also have the responsibility of finding appropriate housing and care. Extended hospitalization increases the chance of infectious disease transmission and draws resources away from other patients.

== Global perspective ==
=== Canada ===
A study conducted on physicians in Ontario investigated how different payment systems impacted patient care in terms of the number of cost shifts and dumping incidents and reported that other factors like altruism or ethics of the doctors and patient behavior played a role in how doctors shifted costs. Some researchers hold the view that the Canadian healthcare system is better designed to minimize the occurrences of patient dumping.

=== Taiwan ===
A study published in 2006 that used voluntary surveys in its methods claimed that the results of the surveys indicated patient dumping was a problem within Taiwan's healthcare system. Researchers reported that funding issues with government budgets and pressure that hospitals felt to stay competitive were among the contributing factors to patient dumping. A previous study published in 2003 also supported the claim that Taiwan's healthcare system is negatively impacted by patient dumping in terms of healthcare quality and increased costs.

=== United Kingdom ===
In a study conducted in the United Kingdom the issue of inappropriately discharging a patient has more to do with delaying the discharge than expediting the discharge. A report published in 2004 claimed that prisons were overcrowded and that one of the populations at risk of living in adverse conditions were mentally ill incarcerated individuals who were dumped in prisons.

== Usage ==
=== Other associated names or terms ===
Other terms used in relation to the practice of patient dumping are frequent-user patient, revolving-door, and bed blockers. These terms were contrived by some hospital staff who noted how these patients had reoccurring hospitalizations. Other ways homeless dumping is described is with phrases like inappropriate patient discharges and economically motivated transfers.

==== "Granny dumping" ====
Granny dumping is "the abandonment of an elderly person in a public place such as a hospital or nursing home, especially by a relative". The term was introduced in the early 1980s by professionals in the medical and social work fields. It may be carried out by family members who are unable or unwilling to continue providing care due to financial problems, burnout, lack of resources (such as home health or assisted living options), or stress. However, instances of institutional granny dumping, by hospitals and care facilities, has also been known to occur.

The "dumping" may involve the literal abandonment of an elderly person, who is taken to a location such as hospital waiting area or emergency room and then left, or in the refusal to return to collect an elderly person after the person is discharged from a hospital visit or hotel stay. While leaving an elderly person in a hospital or nursing facility is a common form of the practice, there have been incidences of elderly people being "dumped" in other locations, such as the side of a public street.

=== Usage in the media and press ===
- Associated Press; February 9, 2007; Los Angeles. A hospital van dropped off a homeless paraplegic man on Skid Row and left him crawling in the street with nothing more than a soiled gown and a broken colostomy bag. Police said the incident was a case of "homeless dumping" and were questioning officials from the hospital.
- Associated Press, October 25, 2006; Los Angeles. "L.A. Police Allege Homeless Dumping." Authorities have launched a criminal investigation into suspected homeless dumping on Skid Row after police witnessed ambulances leaving five people on a street there during the weekend.

== See also ==
- Greyhound therapy
- Emergency Medical Treatment and Active Labor Act
- Skid row
