= List of tent cities in the United States =

This is a list of tent cities in the United States. A tent city is an encampment or housing facility made using tents or other temporary structures.

== West Coast ==
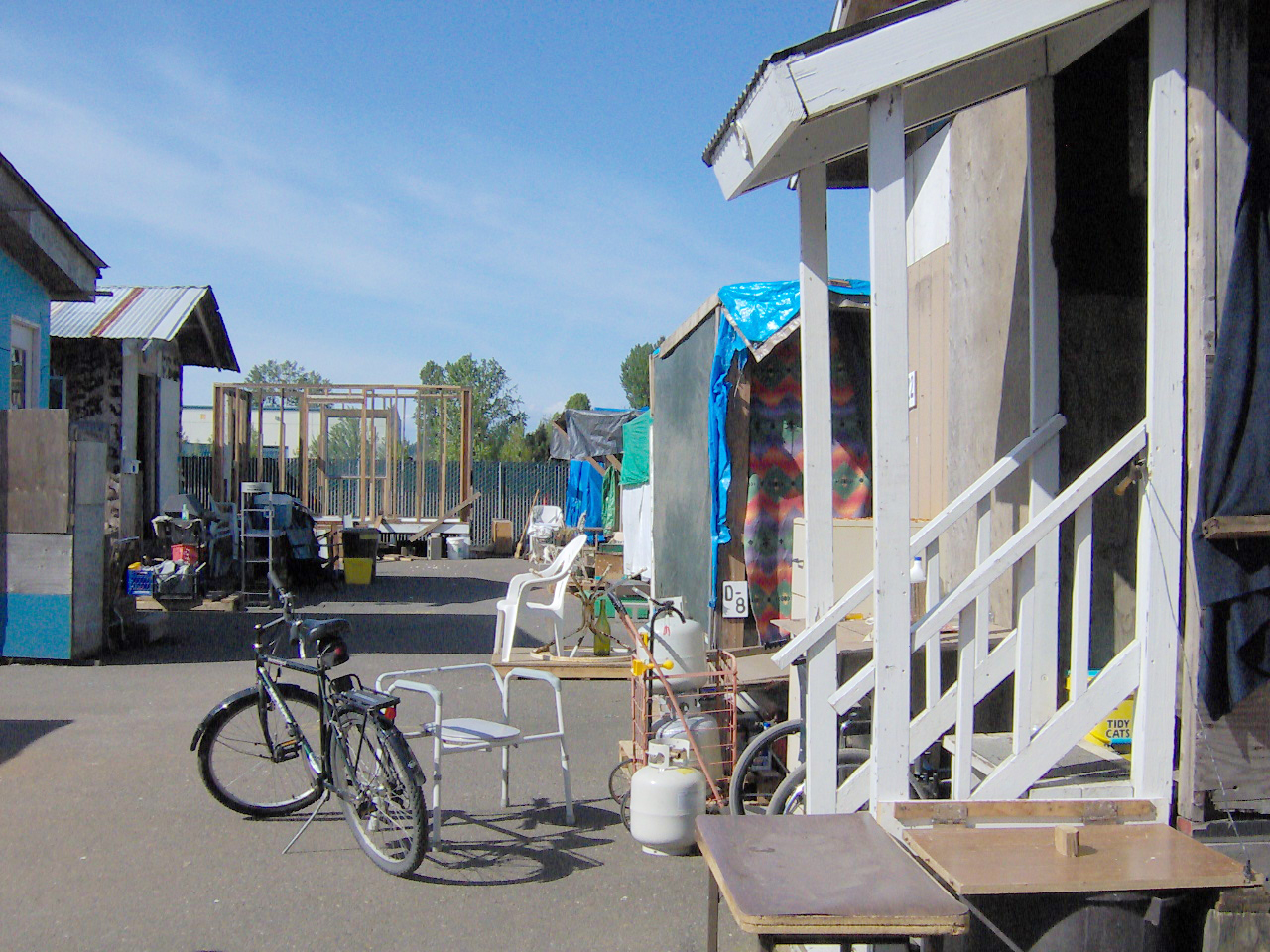
Side Street in Dignity Village, Portland, Oregon

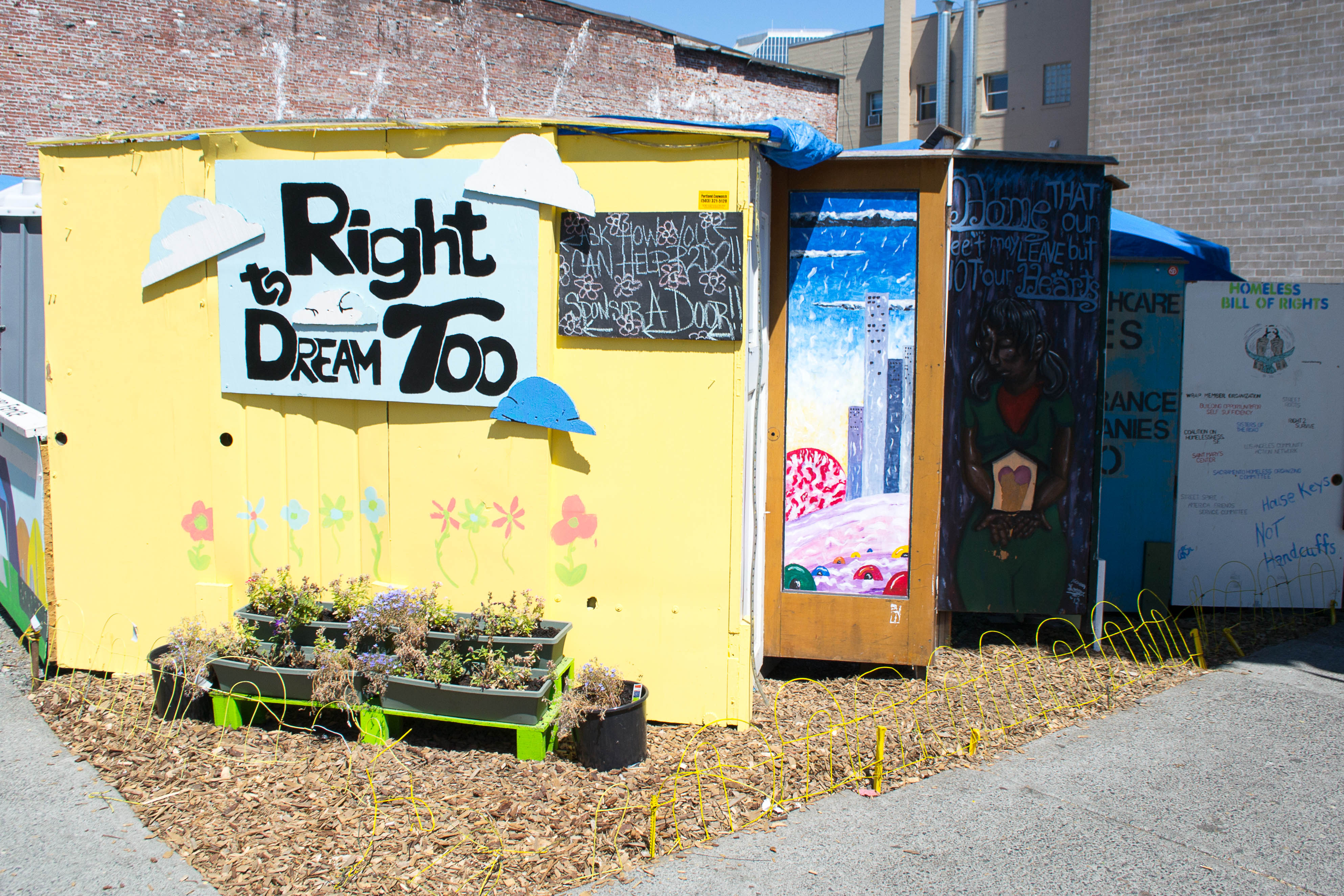
The former Right 2 Dream Too camp in Portland, Oregon

- Anaheim, California: Skid River
- Anchorage, Alaska: 3rd Ave and Ingra Street encampment
- Berkeley, California: Seabreeze, on and off settlement in People's Park
- Chico, California: Comanche Creek
- Eugene, Oregon: Opportunity Village, Westmoreland Park
- Eureka, California: Devil's Playground
- Hawaii: Pu'uhonua o Waianae in Waianae.
- Las Vegas, Nevada: Tent cities are prevalent in downtown, including G Street.
- Long Beach, California: As of April 2021, one is located near Interstate 405 and 710 freeways. In September 2008, five people were shot dead at a homeless encampment near the present-day one near 405 in what is known to be one of the most deadliest acts of violence against the homeless community. In 2018, two gang members were found guilty and sentenced to life without parole. One victim was killed due to a drug disagreement; the other four witnessed the murder and were killed for this reason.
- Los Angeles and in general Los Angeles County is home to many encampments, which are heavily based in downtown Los Angeles, Fashion District, Hollywood, Skid Row, Venice Beach, and Westlake. An estimated 40,000 homeless live in L.A. and up to 70,000 countywide. The encampments on Venice Beach started to be cleared out in late July 2021, with some tents and property of homeless residents still in process of being moved. LA Mayor Eric Garcetti signed a bill to criminalize homeless sleeping and taking up shelter in certain areas of the city; this led to riots and protests at his house with 50 protesters, and a rock was thrown at his house. SoFi Stadium in Inglewood was at the center of attention in January 2022 for sweeps due to the upcoming Super Bowl 2022.
- National City, California
- Novato, California: Lee Gerner Park
- Oakland, California: 77th Avenue encampment, Fruitvale Home Depot encampment.
- Oceanside, California: South Ocean Blvd. encampment, Roymar Road which was later replaced with rocks in May 2021
- Olympia, Washington: Camp Quixote.; The Jungle (Olympia)
- Ontario, California: Temporary Homeless Service Area (THSA)
- Petaluma, California: Petaluma River encampment peaked at around 300 residents and may have some presence still.
- Portland, Oregon: Dignity Village, Right 2 Dream Too, Hazelnut Grove
- Rohnert Park, California: Roberts Lake encampment
- Salinas, California: There is a tent city in Salinas’ historic Chinatown.
- San Francisco has at least 8,000 sheltered and/or homeless population, 1% of SF's population. Homeless encampments have sprouted and are more common in the areas of SoMa, Tenderloin, and have stayed in front of the San Francisco City Hall and areas throughout the city.
- San Jose, California: The Jungle was at its time one of the largest homeless encampments in the US before the spike in the homeless tent usage throughout North America in the late 2010s. In 2013, it had 175 people. Other encampments in San Jose include the one on Berryessa and McKee, which is visible from space.
- San Diego has multiple homeless camps. In March 2021, a truck driver plowed into an encampment in downtown San Diego, killing 3 homeless men and wounding six others; the driver was arrested for manslaughter and DUI.
- Santa Barbara, California: In Isla Vista, California, which is technically separate from Santa Barbara, there are three parks with tent cities.
- Santa Cruz, California: There are about 1,200 to 1,700 homeless in Santa Cruz, 3.5% of the city; many had lived or are living in Ross Camp (200 people) and San Lorenzo Park (up to 300 people; closed in late 2022).

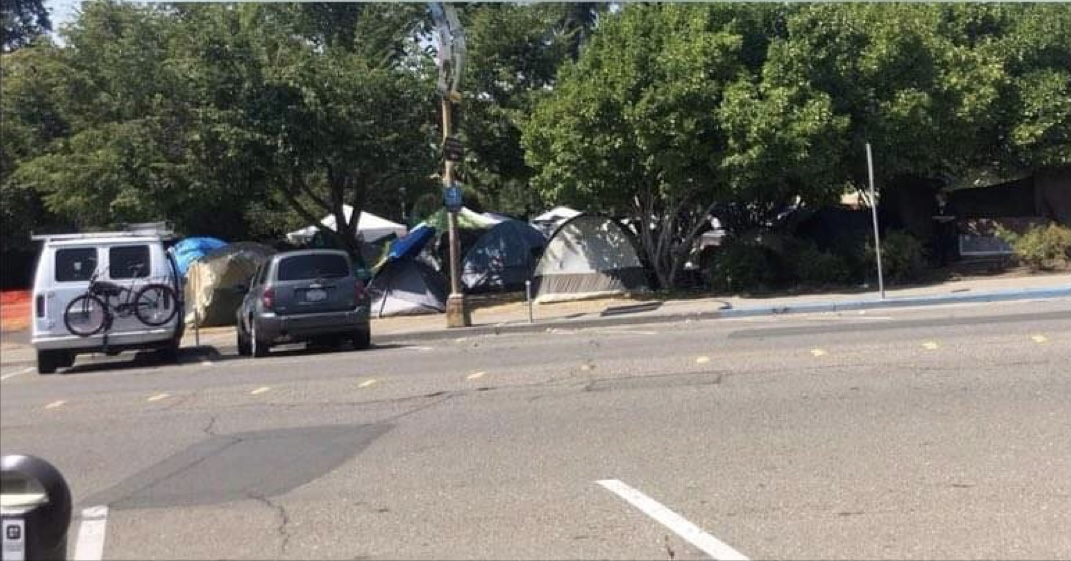
Homeless tent city in Fremont Park, Santa Rosa, California, in August 2020.

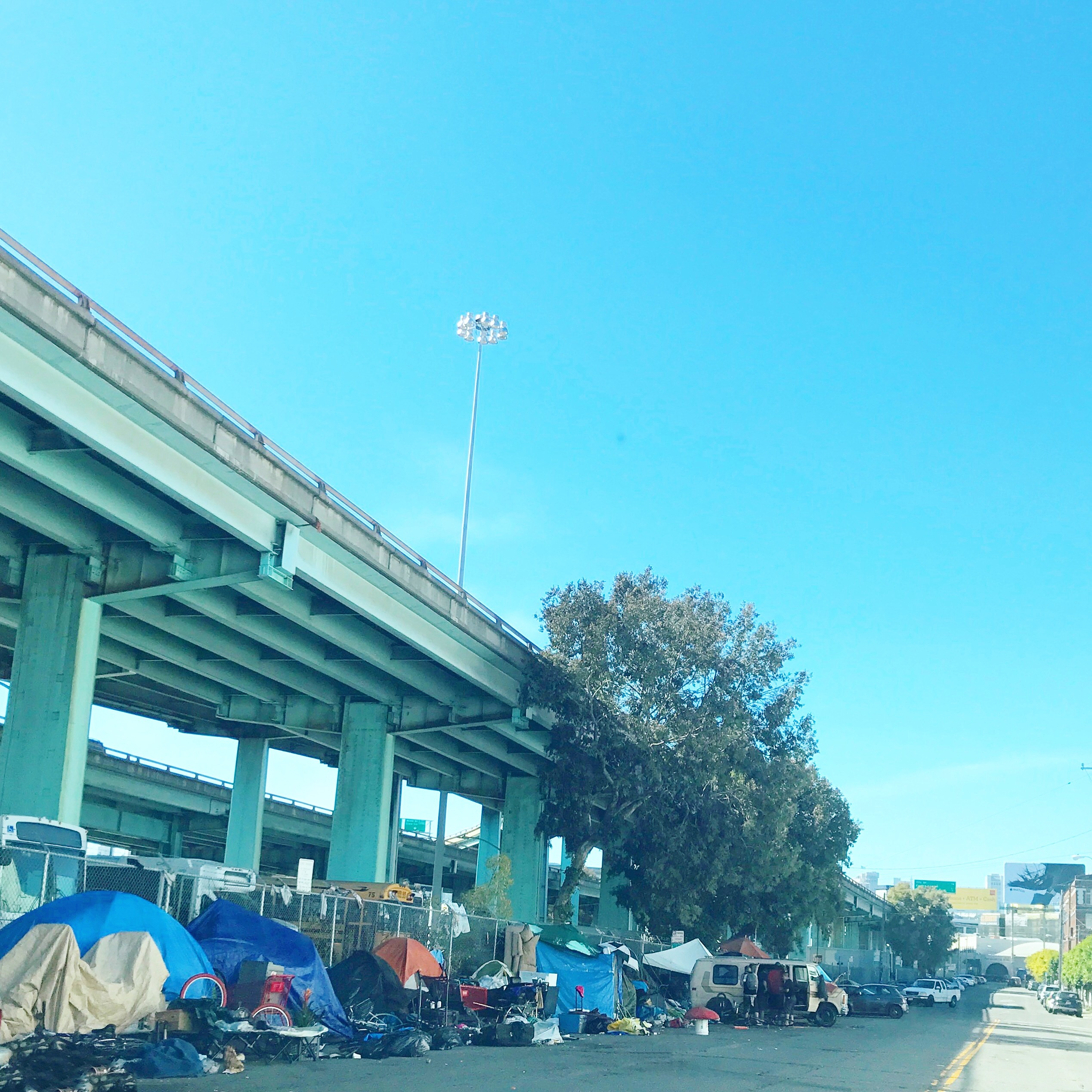
Tents of homeless people in San Francisco, 2017

- Santa Rosa, California: There is only one encampment with four or more tents/structures: located by a church and small shopping district near Sebastopol Road and South Wright Road. There was one on 4th Street in front of the Chelino's Mexican Restaurant parking lot, and on-and-off settlement on Morgan Street and Industrial Drive. Doyle Community Park, Fremont Park. Joe Rodota Trail, and Homeless Hill are defunct or have occasional settlement.
- Sacramento, California: American River encampment Tent City and Safe Ground
- Seattle: Broadview Thomas School encampment, CHAZ, The Jungle, Nickelsville, Tent City 3 and Tent City 4
- Spokane, Washington: Camp Hope is located on Washington State Department of Transportation property adjacent to Interstate 90. With a population of over 600, it the largest homeless encampment on state land in Washington.
- Vallejo, California: Wilson Avenue and Sacramento Street
- Ventura, California: River Haven

== Mountain and Midwest states ==
- Ann Arbor, Michigan: Camp Take Notice, Ann Arbor, Michigan
- Traverse City, Michigan: The Pines
- Grand Rapids, Michigan: Heartside Park
- Colorado River: The Point, where the Gunnison River and Colorado River meet
- Chicago: Tent City, Uptown Tent City
- Denver: Denver has many homeless encampments that either have existed or currently exist or in same spots, including those in RiNo, and one that shut down there in November 2020 Woodstock West was one.
- Detroit: One in Hart Plaza
- Fort Wayne, Indiana: Along the St. Marys River
- Indianapolis: downtown Indianapolis
- Bernalillo County, New Mexico: Parts of International District
- Camp Hope, Las Cruces, New Mexico
- St. Louis, Missouri had a camp at a park near downtown which was cleared in January 2021, and homeless camps still exist in the Saint Louis area.
- Minneapolis, Minnesota: 2020 Minneapolis homeless encampments on park property
- Ogden, Utah
- Salt Lake City, Utah: 600 West, and Pioneer Park has an encampment.

== Southern US ==
- Asheville, North Carolina
- Atlanta: “The Hill”, Buckhead
- Austin, Texas banned homeless camping in April 2021. Homeless camps, as of May, exist in Austin including one on Lady Bird Trail. In May 2021, the camping ban was reinstated after a ballot proposition was approved by voters. The ban introduces potential penalties for camping, sitting, or lying down on a public sidewalk and outdoors in downtown Austin or the area around the University of Texas campus.
- Fayette County, Tennessee: Tent City
- Greenville, South Carolina: Tent City
- Maricopa County Sheriff's Tent City, Phoenix, Arizona
- Jacksonville, Florida had a significant tent city downtown, until it was dispersed in March 2021. Smaller homeless tent cities or tents may exist in Jacksonville.
- Lubbock, Texas: Avenue A and 13th Street encampment
- Norfolk, Virginia
- Pensacola, Florida
- Tampa, Florida

== East Coast ==
- Mass and Cass in Boston, Massachusetts: As of early September 2021, a tent city grew to over 100 residents from a "dozen in a matter of weeks" in the Melnea Cass Boulevard area, which is informally nicknamed "Methadone Mile".
- Camden, New Jersey: Transition Park, Camden, New Jersey
- Hartford, Connecticut: Downtown Hartford
- Tent City (100+ residents) of Lakewood, New Jersey
- New York City: One in Elmhurst, Queens as of July 2020, and Occupy City Hall They were reported in Chelsea, Manhattan and Bushwick, Brooklyn according to a 2020 NBC article. The three other boroughs reported them during this summer of 2020. There is a tent city in Bedford-Stuyvesant, Brooklyn, where a woman was protecting a friend near a tent city, where a homeless man became enraged after suspecting that the two got close to his tent, making him nervous. He then stabbed the woman, 40, who was not a resident of the tent city or believed to be homeless, to death.
- Philadelphia: Kensington
- Pittsburgh, Pennsylvania: In nearby Scotts Township
- Washington, D.C.: Encampment under L and M Street underpasses.

== Other ==
- St. Vincent de Paul property, Fourth Avenue North, Saint Petersburg, Florida

== See also ==
- Skid row
- Hooverville
