= The Jungle (Olympia, Washington) =

Homeless encampment in the United States

- Homeless encampment
- Location within Washington (state)
- Coordinates: 47.0441°N 122.8537°W
- Country: United States
- State: Washington
- County: Thurston
- City: Olympia
- Founded: c. 2016

Population (2026)
  - Total: 275

The Jungle is a 20-acre (8.1 ha) homeless encampment in Olympia, Washington that has existed since c. 2016. It has been described as one of the largest encampments in the state of Washington, and as of 2026, it is estimated to contain hundreds of campers. The majority of the encampment is private property owned by a development corporation; some of the area is city property, and some is State of Washington property adjacent to Interstate 5.

According to Olympia Mayor Dontae Payne, the encampment was the city's only major encampment at the beginning of 2026.

In 2018, a socialist candidate for a Tumwater City Council vacancy used their organization of a cleanup at the camp, which they called Jungle of Hope, and desire to appropriate the property, as campaign information on Change.org.

In 2019, Seattle television station KIRO-TV reported on homeless people digging up erosion control material and tunneling under Interstate 5 at the encampment.

A Seattle television station reported that violence at the camp was common, and bodies of victims had been disposed of in burn pits there.

In 2024, a man in the camp was murdered with "homemade napalm".

In June 2026, a missing child was removed from the camp by U.S. Marshals.

== See also ==
- The Jungle (San Jose) – Homeless encampment in San Jose, California
- The Jungle (Seattle) – Greenbelt in Seattle, Washington, US
- List of tent cities in the United States
