= Human Wasteland =

Map based visualization project

(Human) Wasteland was a map based visualization project created by software engineer Jennifer Wong. The map visualized reports of human waste reported to the 311 complaint system in San Francisco, California.

== Background ==
Locations were mapped out from 311 reports that covered a seven-year period from 2008 to 2015. The map features a brown-colored "poop" emoji used to identify locations of human waste reports throughout the city. The project reveals concentrated areas within neighborhoods and brings about an awareness of homelessness in the city of San Francisco.

There are thousands of homeless people in San Francisco with limited access to public bathrooms. On the website, Wong urges people to educate themselves about the issue of homelessness and suggests donating to LavaMae, a homeless outreach organization.

== See also ==
- Homelessness in the San Francisco Bay Area
