= Right 2 Dream Too =

Encampment in Portland, Oregon, United States

- Homeless encampment
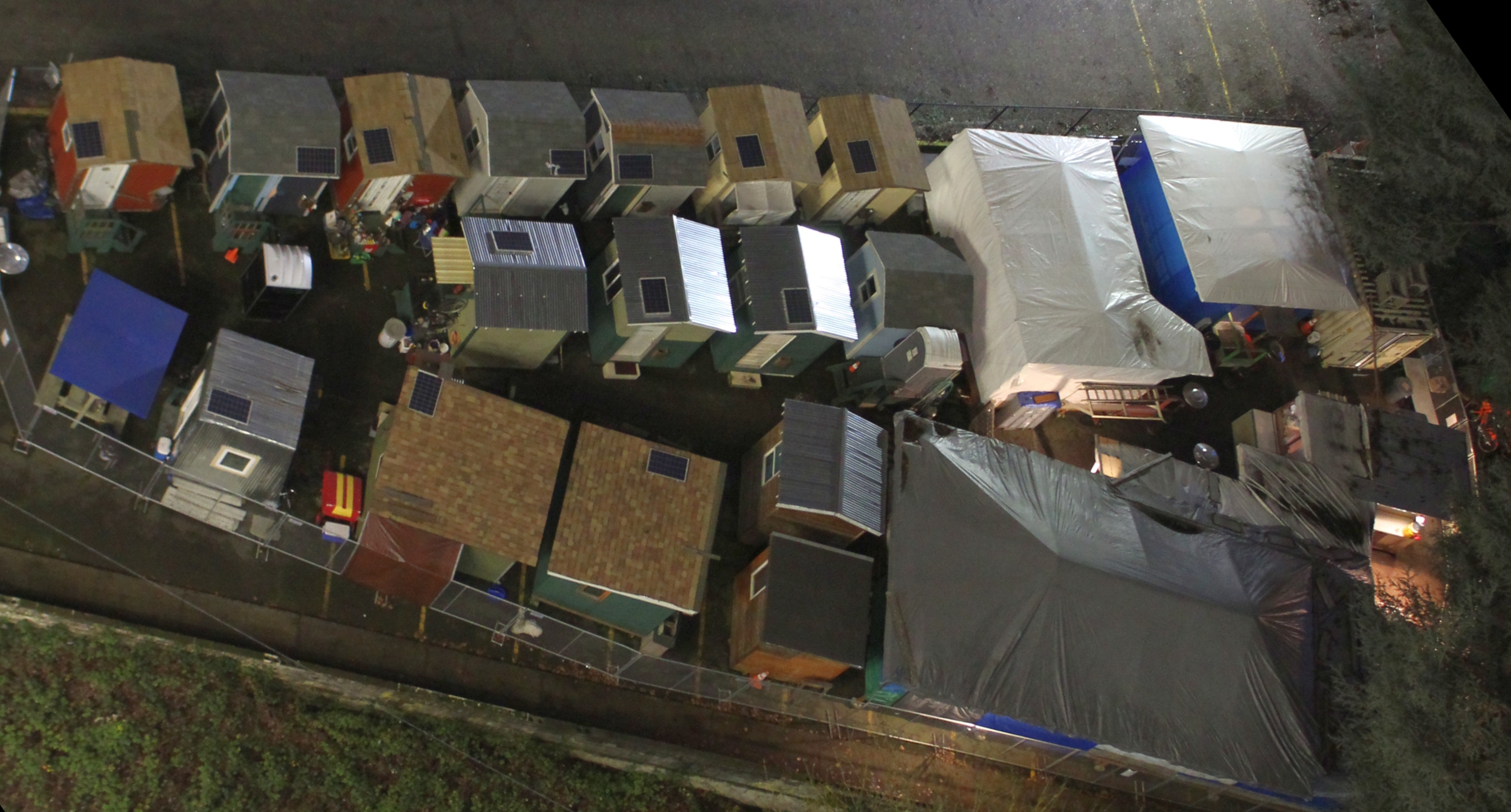
- Aerial view of Right 2 Dream Too

- Location within Oregon
- Coordinates: 45.5300914°N 122.6688183°W
- Country: United States
- State: Oregon
- County: Multnomah
- City: Portland
- Founded: 2011

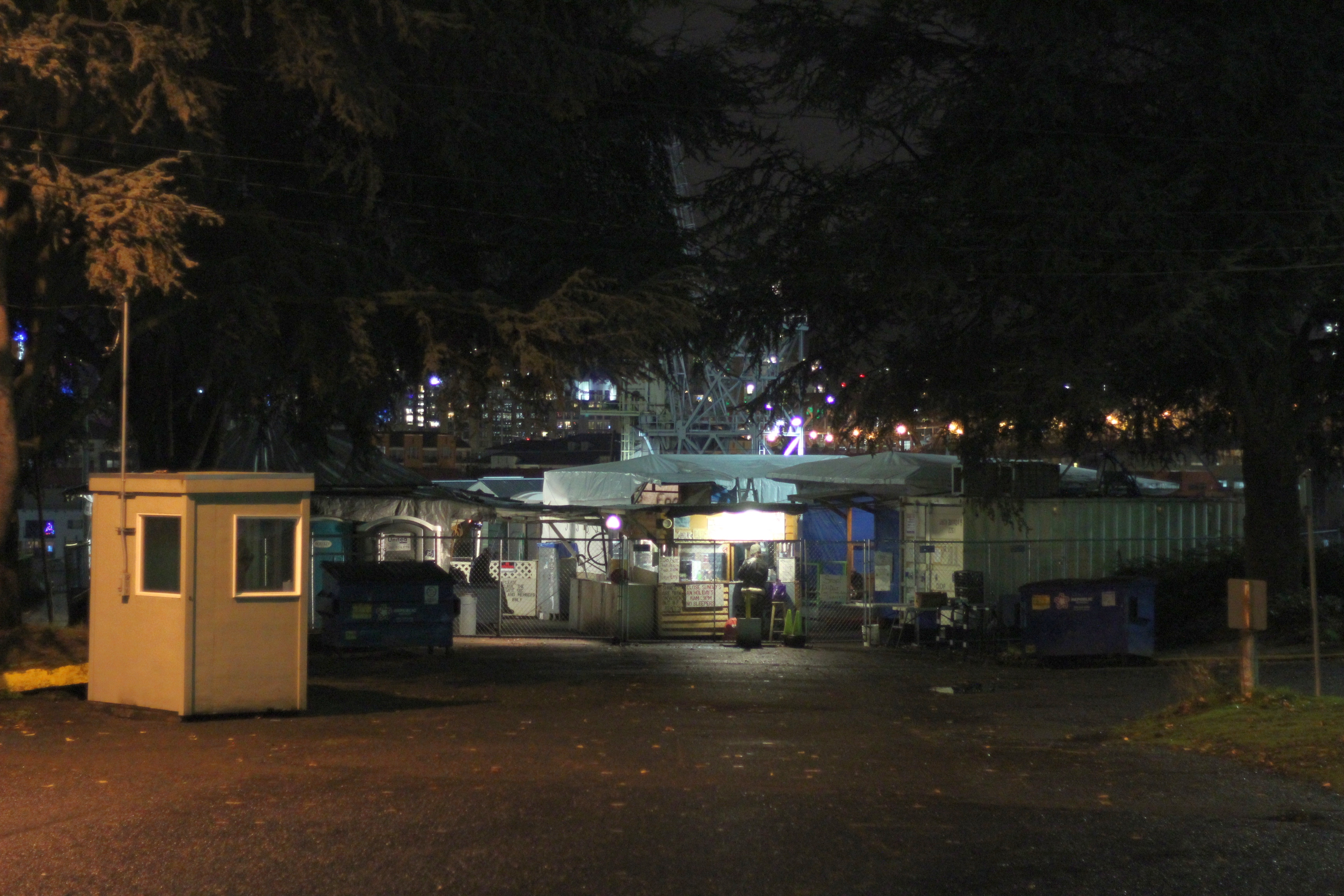
Right 2 Dream Too main entry in December 2019 near the Moda Center

Right 2 Dream Too (known to locals as R2D2 or R2DTOO) is a self-managed homeless encampment in Portland, Oregon incorporated as a nonprofit organization. The initial encampment was set up in October, 2011 on private property in Old Town Chinatown at Northwest 4th Avenue and West Burnside Street. The camp had permission from the property owner, but it was not authorized by the city. Right 2 Survive, the encampment's parent group and founder, organized an overnight shelter run by other homeless.

The operation erected tents and built a fence without necessary permits, and was assessed fines for doing so.

== Operations ==
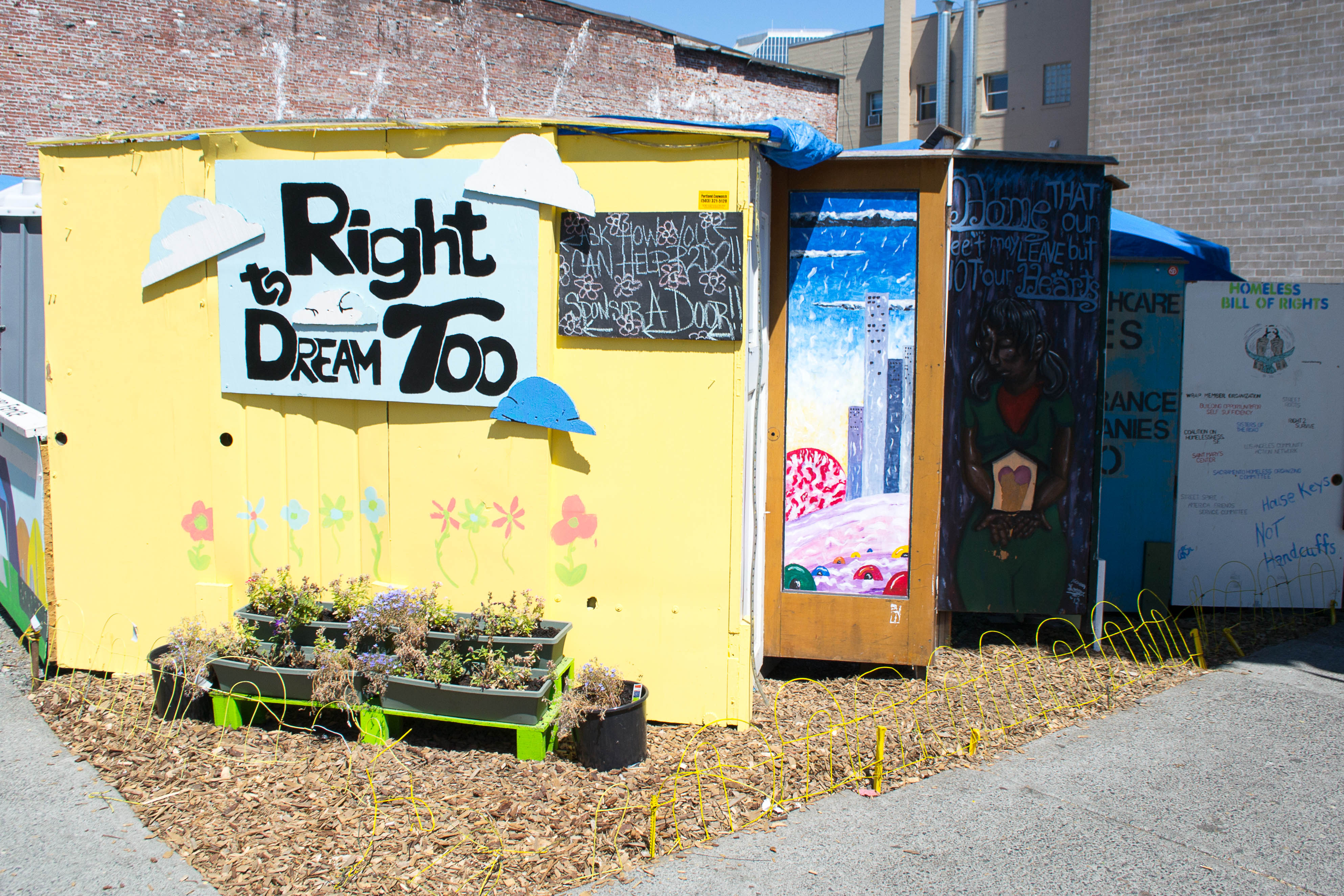
The former Right to Dream Too encampment site in August 2013 in Old Town Chinatown

Code of conduct reads drug and weapon free zone as cited by Oregon Public Broadcasting in February 2016. There is a general area and a member area. Full time lodging and tiny homes are for member benefit only. Membership is restricted and it is subject to several rounds of approval process by existing members. Non-members sleep on the floor and are restricted to 12 hours per 24 hour period, as of June 2017.

The camp is self managed and has a 24-hour security desk staffed by camp residents at its entrance. While monetary contribution is not required of occupants, contribution towards the operation of the encampment is expected.

Portland Tribune reported in August 2020 that about 100 people utilize the encampment every 24 hours, but R2D2 does not collect or maintain any information on the overnight guests.

== Location ==
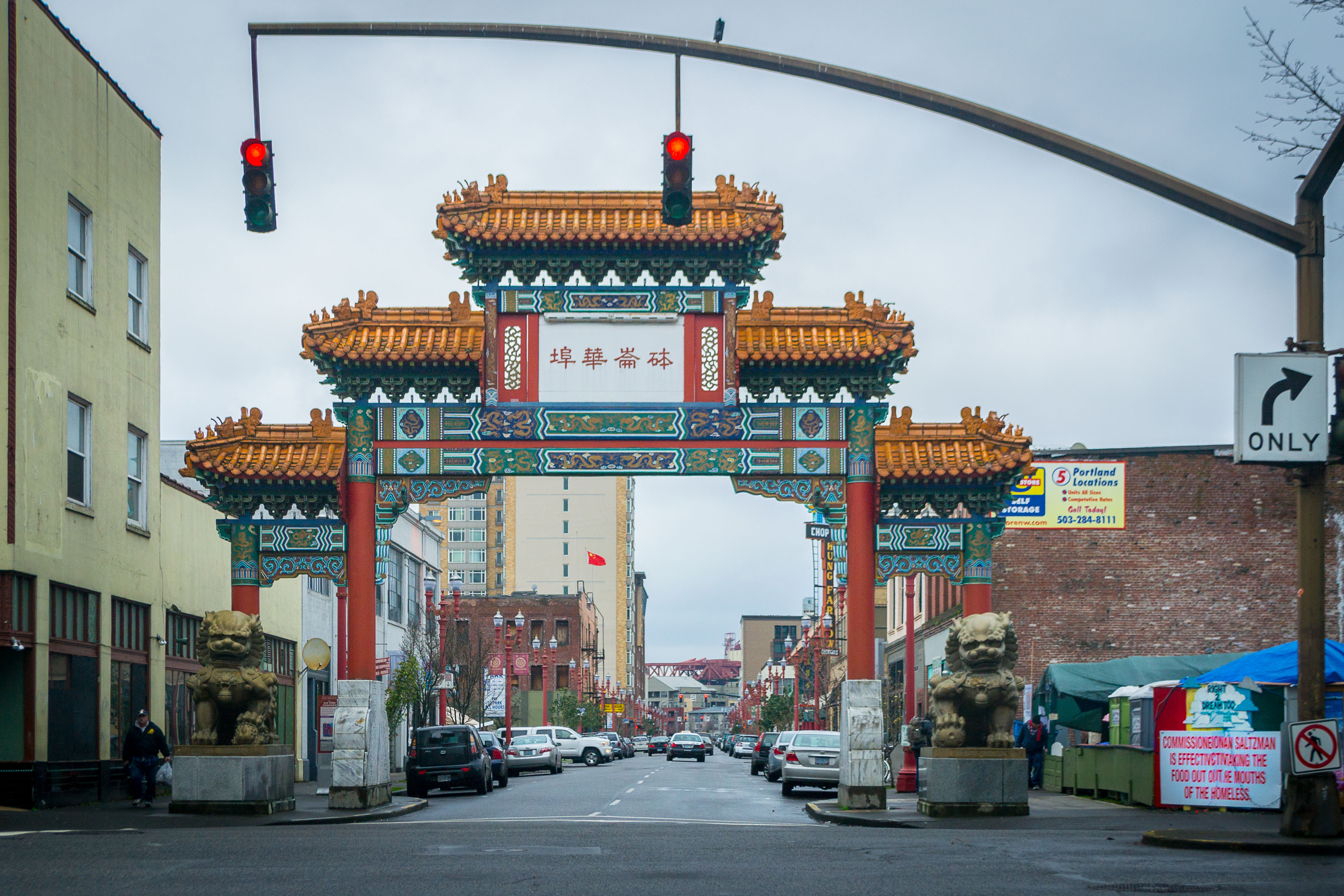
Right 2 Dream Too's former location at NW 4th and Burnside Street entrance to Old Town Chinatown where they remained until July 2017

The encampment began at the original location in 2011. The Chinese Consolidated Benevolent Association objected to its presence next to the Chinatown Gate. In addition, the Portland Business Alliance sent a letter to city officials asking for removal or relocation of Right 2 Dream Too around December 2012.

In 2013, the encampment and Portland city officials developed tentative plans to move the homeless camp to a city-owned parking lot under the Broadway Bridge in Portland's Pearl District. Additional locations for the camp's relocation have also been considered by the organization and city officials. Business and neighborhood leaders in the Pearl District have fought in opposition against the proposed Pearl District move. Complaints about its transient campsite to the city's Bureau of Development Services dried up and dropped to just one in a 12 month period by February 2015. Commissioner Dan Saltzman gave his opinion that "People that are concerned about their presence have given up. They've given up on us [city leaders]. I think that has a lot to do with it."

In 2015, the city considered moving the encampment to a lot next to a metal finishing business that has been at the same location for 72 years, and has been using the lot in question with permission for a long period. The proposal was blocked by a state land use board and the move did not materialize. The business sued the city for $9.9 million in 2018 alleging breach of agreement over the ordeal. This dispute was unresolved as of August 2020. A warehouse in Northwest Portland and a location in the industrial area of the central east side were considered as well, but did not materialize due to cost and neighborhood oppositions. In the site selection process, a developer pledged $800,000 to keep the campsite out of the Pearl District.

In April 2017, the city agreed to allow the organized encampment to move to a land owned by the Portland Bureau of Transportation and stay for up to two years. The camp remained at the original location for over five years before moving to a temporary site in North Portland on N Thunderbird Way in July 2017. KATU announced in March 2019 that its lease was going to expire in April 2019. It was reported in August 2020 that the lease at this site has been extended until April 2021.

The most recent encampment is located at its temporary site at 999 N Thunderbird Way near the Moda Center.

== See also ==
- List of tent cities in the United States
