= Dr. Jose Rizal Park =

Park in Seattle, Washington, U.S.

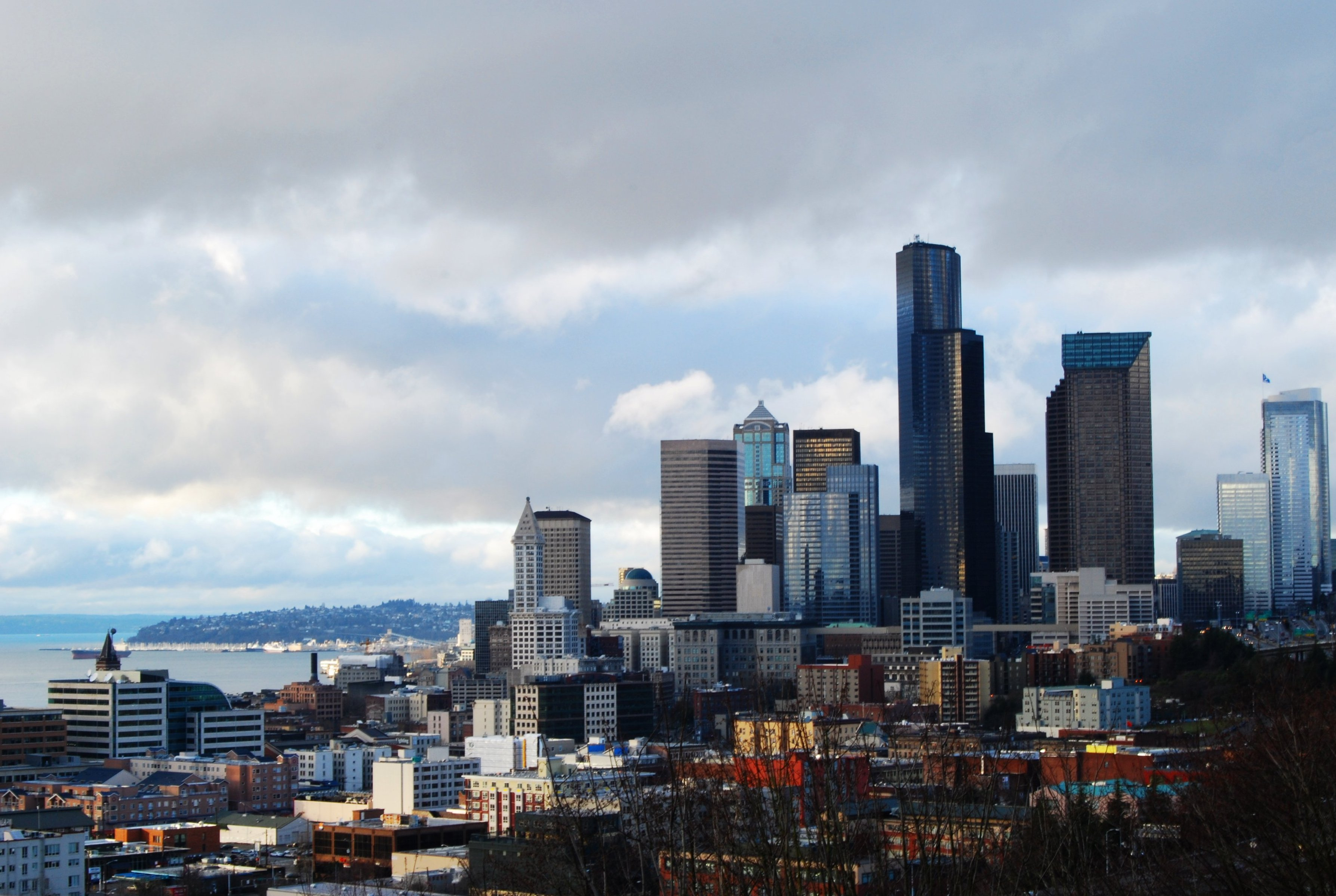
- Seattle skyline as seen from the park
- Interactive map of Dr. Jose Rizal Park
- Location: Seattle, Washington, U.S.
- Coordinates: 47°35′35.1″N 122°19′6.9″W

Dr. Jose Rizal Park is a 9.6 acre (39,000 m^{2}) park on the west slope of Beacon Hill in Seattle, Washington, United States. The land, condemned by the city in 1917 for engineering purposes, was acquired by the Parks Department in 1971, and the park was dedicated eight years later. The park is named after José Rizal, the de facto national hero of the Philippines.

Rizal Park is bounded on the west by Interstate 5, on the north by Interstate 90, on the east by 12th Avenue S., and on the south by S. Judkins Street and the Jungle. The park consists of a grassy upper area with shelter and picnic tables, a wooded hillside, and an off-leash dog park at the foot of the hill.

== History ==
The land that would become Rizal Park was condemned by the city in 1917 for engineering purposes during the regrading of Dearborn and Jackson streets but was left undeveloped for several decades. The property was acquired in 1971 by the Parks Department, who built a small viewpoint and parking area. In 1973, the Filipino Alumni Association petitioned the city to honor the Filipino nationalist José Rizal; the park was renamed to Dr. Jose Rizal Park the following year. Funds to develop the park's facilities were granted by the U.S. Department of Housing and Urban Development in 1978 and work began with a groundbreaking on June 16, 1979.

The city government dedicated Rizal Park on June 7, 1981, with opening ceremonies led by mayor Charles Royer as part of Seattle's "Philippine Week". The 8.4-acre (3.4 ha) park was designed by Elaine Day LaTourelle with a picnic shelter, an amphitheater, play areas, and a public restroom. A mural by Val Laigo depicted the cultural diversity of the Philippines and the country's relationship with the United States. The expansion cost $343,500 to construct. Seattle Times design critic Norman Johnston described the park's fixtures and materials as "economical, unpretentious and substantial supports" and praised its simple design on a complicated site.

== See also ==
- National Register of Historic Places listings in Seattle
