= The Jungle (Seattle) =

Greenbelt in Seattle, Washington, US

East Duwamish Greenbelt
- "The Jungle"
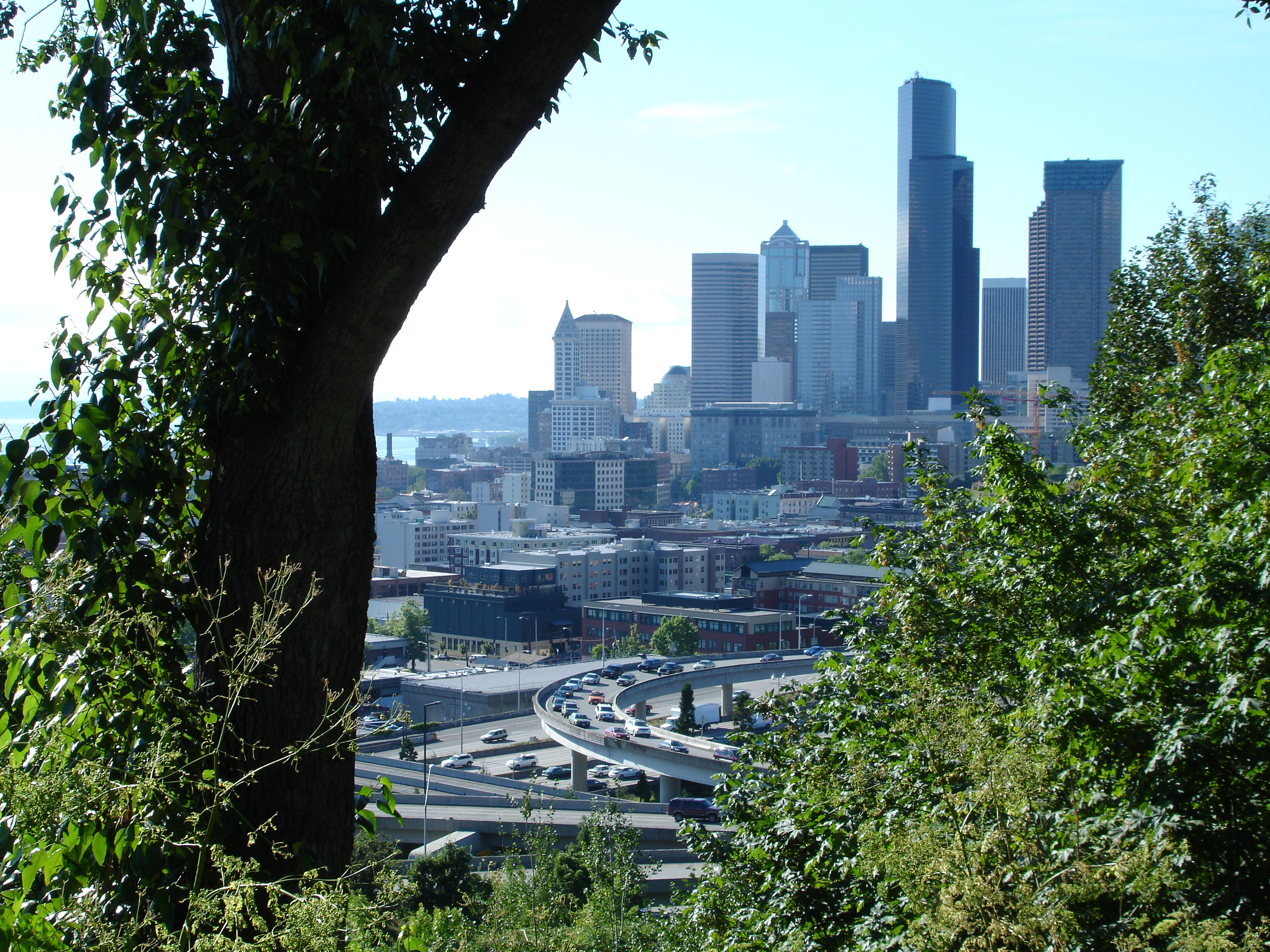
- Downtown Seattle as seen from near the Jungle
- Interactive map of East Duwamish Greenbelt
- Type: Green belt
- Location: Seattle, Washington, United States
- Coordinates: 47°34′30″N 122°19′6″W
- Area: 150 acres (0.61 km^{2})
- Manager: WSDOT; Seattle Parks and Recreation
- Status: Open all year
- Website: Seattle parks website

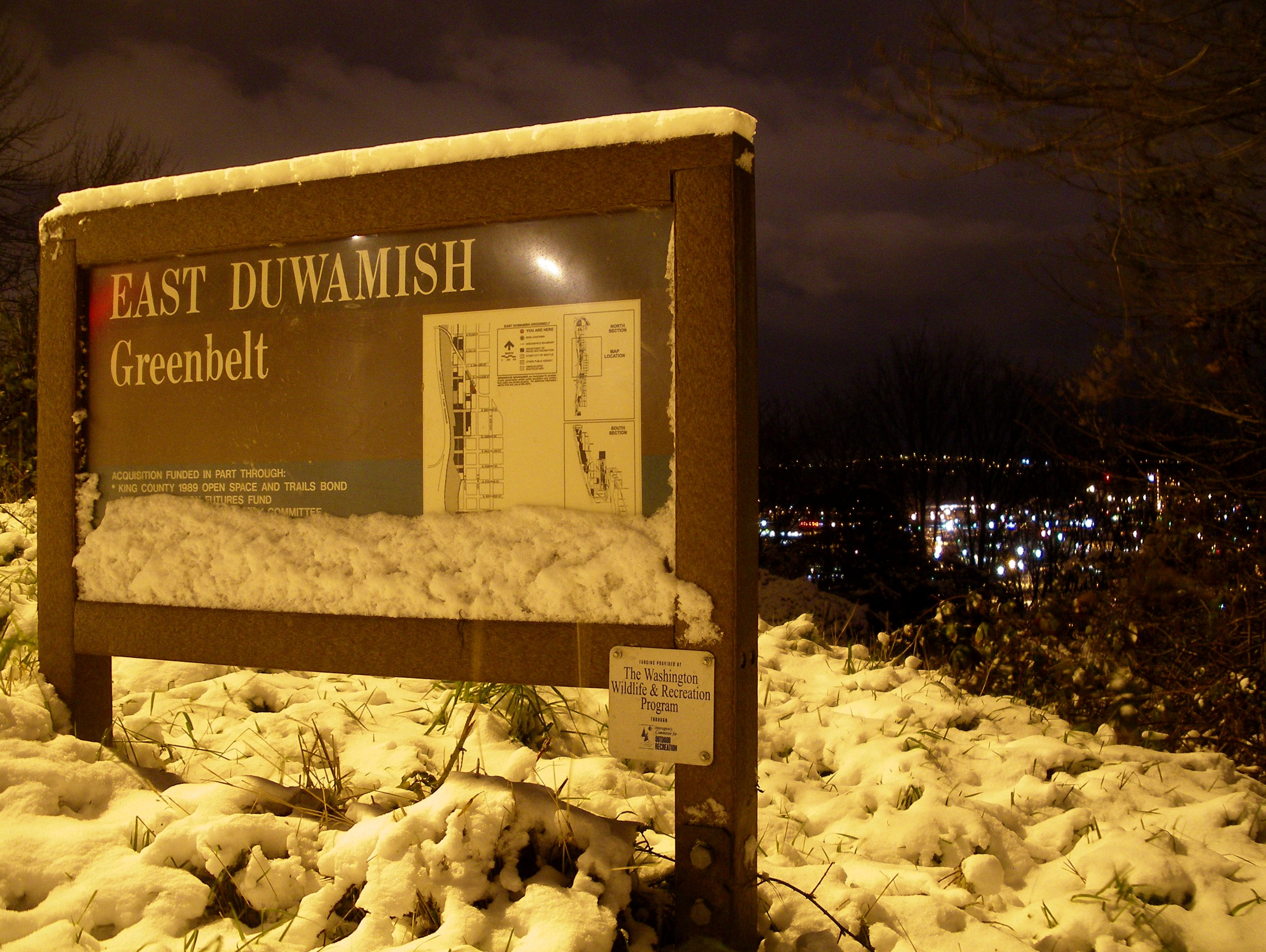
Park sign with West Seattle in the background

The Jungle, officially known as the East Duwamish Greenbelt, is a greenbelt on the western slope of Beacon Hill in Seattle, Washington that is known for its homeless encampments and crime. The Jungle consists of 150 acres (61 ha) underneath and along an elevated section of Interstate 5 between South Dearborn Street and South Lucile Street. An assessment counted 201 tents and estimate of more than 400 people in the area prior to a shooting on January 26, 2016, that increased scrutiny and a sweep of the greenspace. The area continues to be used by the homeless as of 2025.

== Location and ecology ==
The Jungle is situated on the steep western slope of Beacon Hill near the south-end of Downtown Seattle, called the East Duwamish Greenbelt. Bound by Interstate 5 to the west and Interstate 90 to the north, the city and state departments of transportation manage most of the land. The thin tract is about 150 acres (61 ha) and extends south to the Georgetown neighborhood. The wooded area can be entered through Rizal Park, highway maintenance roads, or residential areas on Beacon Hill. Thick blackberry brambles and vines grow among maple and other trees in an urban forest. Various rodents—including rats—and numerous species of birds are common.

== Population ==
Firsthand reports in 2016 described distinct areas within the encampment. The portions under the freeway were referred to as "The Caves" and were within easy walking distance to a nearby methadone clinic. Alcoholism was more prevalent in the southern stretch while residents tended to remain isolated in the brush in the eastern section. A survey conducted by the city of Seattle and the United Gospel Mission later in the year determined 111 people remained in The Jungle even after multiple attempts to close the encampment. Approximately 80 percent were male. By race, 45 percent of residents were white and 45 percent were black. A large-scale sweep in January 2020 counted 30 people among 75 partially abandoned tents and other makeshift structures.

== History ==
Homeless people may have used the area as early as the 1930s. It gained notoriety in the 1990s when the city began razing the encampments. In 1994, about 50 campsites yielded 120 tons of trash. Periodic bulldozing in the 1990s by the city or state department of transportation led to complaints of the city providing little to no warning before enacting cleanups. Seattle's organized tent cities for the homeless are offshoots of illegal communities that formed after squatters were forcibly removed from The Jungle.

Along with numerous and ongoing lower profile deaths and murders, the bodies of three women murdered by a serial killer were found in the area between September 1997 and February 1998. Other deaths include transients struck by vehicles while attempting to cross the nearby freeways, and even a homeless man sleeping in a blackberry thicket as it was mowed by workers.

The Jungle increasingly became a haven for criminals in the 2000s. Criminal activity has included assaults, rapes, prostitution, and murders. Residences in the Beacon Hill neighborhood complained of being burglarized by those staying in The Jungle. Gang members basing drug trade in the woods also became a concern. In the early 2000s, a gravel road was built for emergency services while brush was cleared for greater visibility. An extension of the Mountain to Sound bike corridor through the Jungle opened in the fall of 2011 in an attempt to revitalize the area. The trail features a paved path, lighting, and fences. The city attempted to clear the encampment twice a year during the mayoral term of Greg Nickels (2002–2009), but such sweeps were less frequent during Michael McGinn's term (2010–2013) as homelessness increased.

From 2011 to 2016, the area was the site of at least 750 incidents responded to by the Seattle Fire Department, of which 500 times were emergency medical situations. By 2016, The Jungle was considered by many as unsafe at any hour, though others argued the dangers was exaggerated by both officials and the media. Weapons, used drug paraphernalia, potentially stolen goods, and human feces were, and continue to be, seen often during the city and state sweeps. In April 2015, police arrested 20 suspects during a series of raids, including Son Van Tran, who Federal prosecutors described as a "boss" in the local drug market.

On January 26, 2016, two people were killed and three were injured during a shooting at the Jungle encampment. The shooting led to calls from Mayor Murray and other local officials to close the encampment per state trespassing laws, though homeless advocates said the city should stop closing unauthorized encampments until it has an alternative location or shelter for campers.

In February, 2016, the Washington State Legislature proposed $1 million to install a 8,000-foot-long (2,400 m), 6-foot-high (1.8 m) razor wire and barbed-wire fence to encircle the 100-acre (40 ha) area. On May 17, 2016, the city of Seattle and the Washington State Department of Transportation (WSDOT) announced plans to permanently clear out The Jungle, with the estimated 300 remaining people living there to be resettled by the Union Gospel Mission. WSDOT also cleared debris from the freeway's underside and improved road access, while the city cleared the hill above the site, at a total cost of $1 million.

A new encampment formed under the Interstate 5 and Interstate 90 interchange to the northwest of the Jungle, dubbed "The New Jungle" or "The Triangle". While sweeps continued, ongoing reports of gunfire and drug abuse triggered a larger police intervention in January 2020. Authorities made seven arrests and identified a large tent in the middle of the encampment where crack, meth, and heroin were sold.

== See also ==
- The Jungle (Olympia, Washington)
