= The Jungle (San Jose) =

Homeless encampment in San Jose, California

Coordinates: 37°19′39″N 121°51′45″W

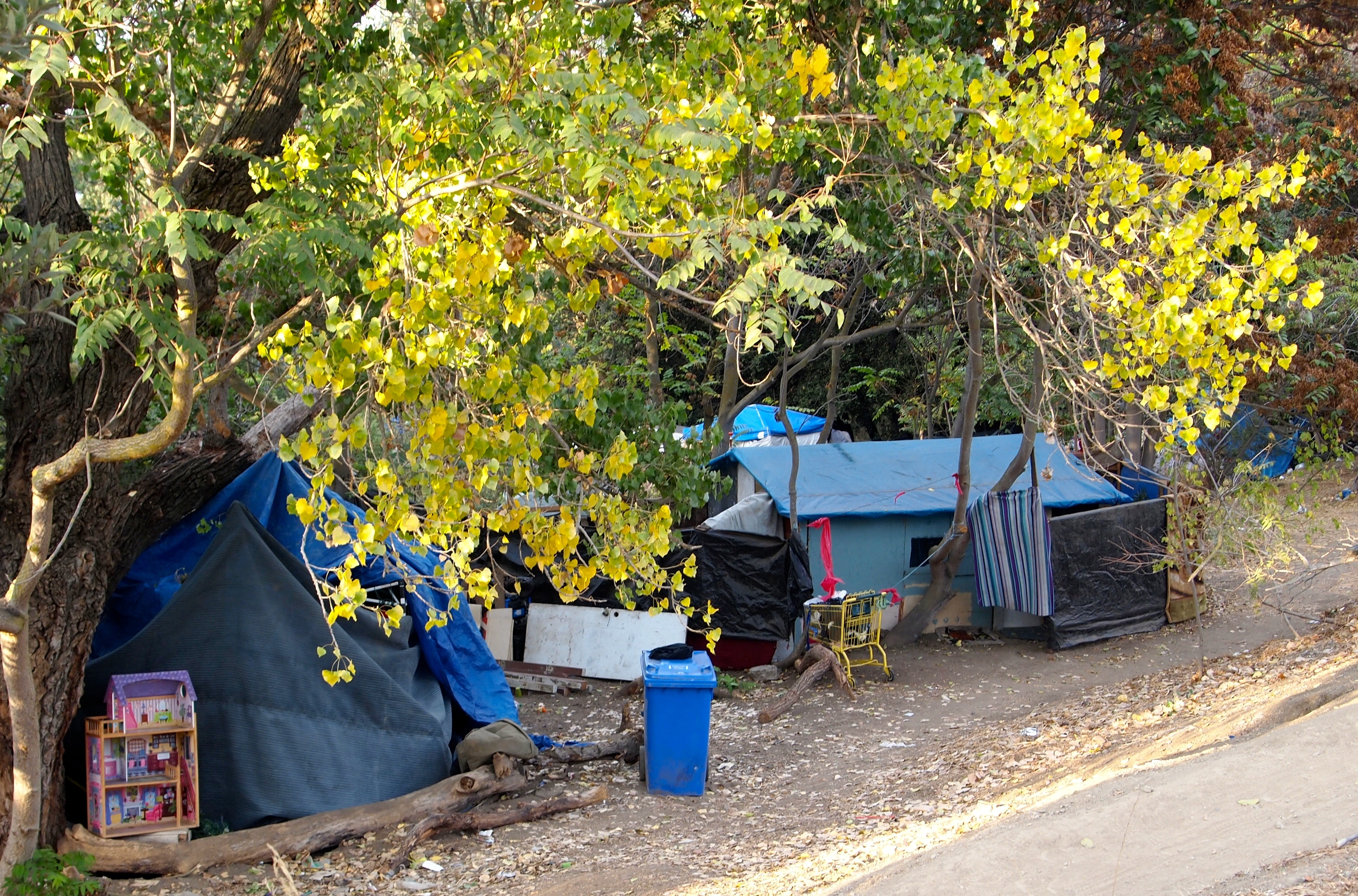
Dwellings in The Jungle in October 2014

The Jungle was a large homeless encampment located in San Jose, California. It was located off Story Road and along Coyote Creek, in an area called Coyote Meadow, and consisted of various makeshift dwellings, shacks, tree houses and tents on around 75 acres (30 ha) of land. During the time of its existence, it was often considered to be one of the largest homeless encampments in the United States.

The Jungle appears to have been in existence from 1999 to early December 2014, per the account of a former resident who lived there, stating in December 2014 that she lived there periodically for fifteen years before it was closed down at that time.

Another former resident referred to it as resembling a "small community" when he lived there, with amenities such as stoves, couches, tarps and motor homes. He also stated that several encampment residents held nine-to-five day jobs, and would stay at the camp because they had no place to live, despite being employed full-time.

== Closure ==
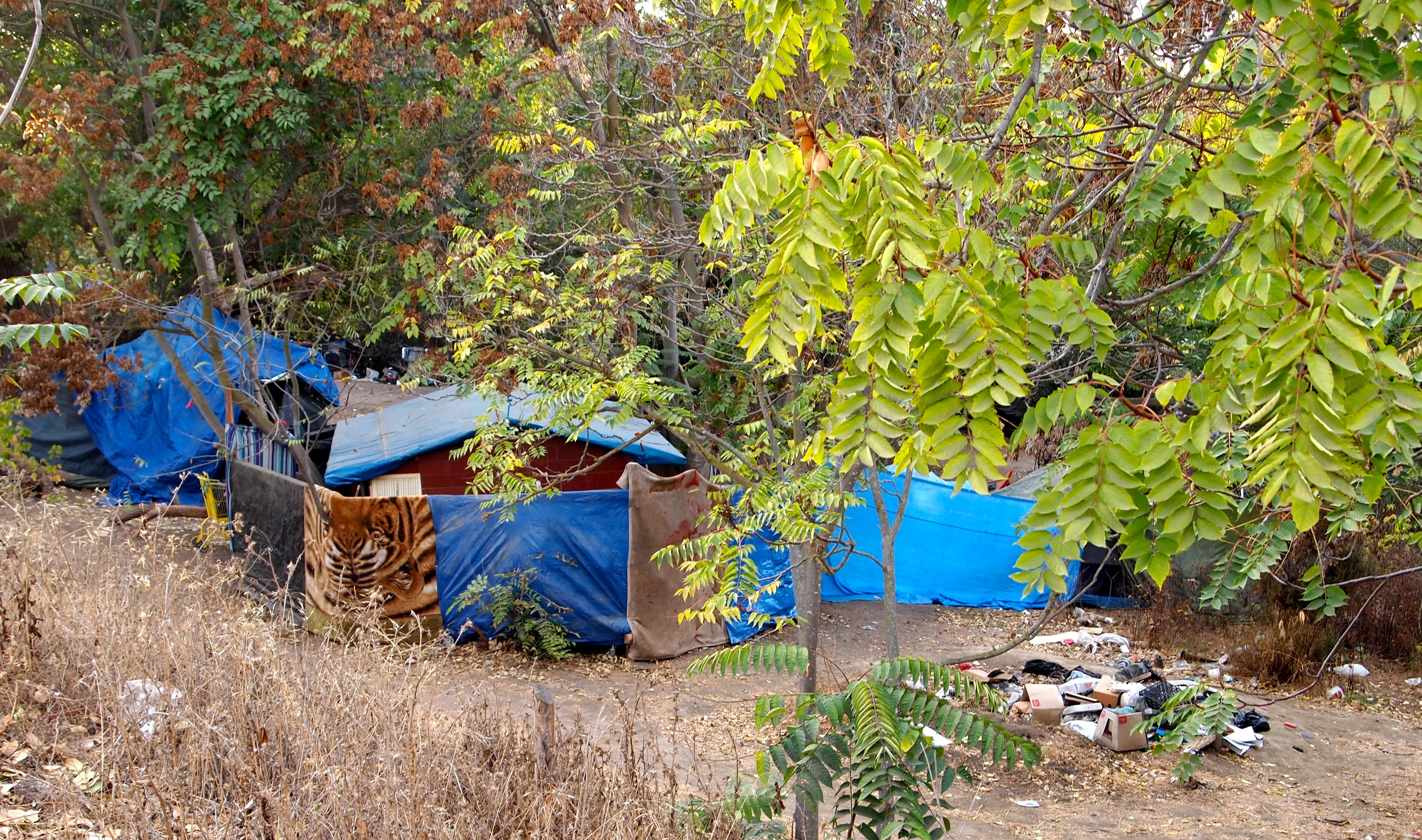
Dwellings in The Jungle in October 2014

An attempted closure that led to 150 people being removed from The Jungle occurred in May 2012. However, people eventually returned to the site.

In July 2013, the San Jose City Council agreed upon a $4 million budget to provide housing for homeless Jungle inhabitants, which marked the beginning of a permanent eviction process. In December 2014, authorities evicted camp residents, closed the site and then demolished it, hauled everything away in garbage trucks, and fenced it off. Around the time of its closing, about 300 people lived there. The Jungle was closed down in part due to pressure from California state and regional water authorities to remove human waste and garbage from Coyote Creek, because it was polluting the San Francisco Bay. It was also reported that complaints about the encampment from area residents was a factor leading to its closure. Additional reasons for the eviction included general unsanitary conditions at the site and an increase in violent incidents.

Prior to being demolished, the city of San Jose utilized the allocated $4 million to relocate Jungle inhabitants into subsidized housing. By early December 2014, housing was secured in the form of apartments for 144 people, and subsidization for two years was allocated. Sixty additional subsidy vouchers were available at the time, but available apartments were not found. A general housing shortage in San Jose was blamed for the lack of available housing, along with high housing costs and limited available low-cost housing.

In 2015, to prevent people from returning to the site, the Rangers of the Watershed Protection Team regularly patrolled the area, and in addition to the fencing that was erected, large boulders were placed next to Story Road to prevent vehicular entry. At this time, after the site's closure, some began referring to the site as Coyote Meadow, its former name before it was called The Jungle.

== See also ==
- Homelessness in the San Francisco Bay Area
- Homelessness in the United States
- Joe Rodota Trail
- List of tent cities in the United States
- Squatting in the United States
- Tent city
