= Hazelnut Grove =

Organized homeless community located in Portland, Oregon, US

- Homeless encampment
- Logo

- Location within Oregon
- Coordinates: 45.5457146°N 122.6795076°W
- Country: United States
- State: Oregon
- County: Multnomah
- City: Portland
- Founded: 2015

Population (2021)
  - Total: 16

Hazelnut Grove is an organized homeless community located in Portland, Oregon. It was founded in 2015, and, since its inception, has survived several attempts to disband or relocate the community. It is recognized and supported by the city government.

The village acts as a transitional neighborhood for people seeking permanent housing.

== Location ==
The community first came together following the Occupy Portland protests in 2011. They relocated several times, finally settling on a plot of land in October 2015.

The community exists at the intersection of North Greeley and Interstate avenues. It is considered part of the Overlook neighborhood in North Portland. It was originally located on a matrix of publicly and privately owned land. It was later fully contained on land owned by the Portland Bureau of Transportation.

The camp lies at the bottom of a steep bluff, and some have cited difficulties with emergency access as being a priority reason for relocation.

== History ==
Campers have used the site for years before Hazelnut Grove was established. The camp began to grow in 2015, and as a result, became more conspicuous. The Oregon Department of Transportation subsequently issued eviction notices to residents. The residents began to organize and appealed to the city. Their appeal was successful, and Mayor Charlie Hales agreed to provide the campers with land, trash service, and restroom facilities, conditional on no further laws being broken.

Since the inception of the camp, the Overlook Neighborhood Association (OKNA) had sought its relocation. City-led mediation talks between the OKNA and Hazelnut Grove residents were not productive. The OKNA had previously requested a public list of campers living in the community from the city to perform background checks, and in 2016, joined a lawsuit against the city pertaining to homeless tolerance. The OKNA later tried to prevent campers from attending neighborhood meetings, but desisted after the city threatened to cease recognizing OKNA as an organization.

By 2016, there were 30 residents. In addition to tents, tiny houses and sleeping pods had been constructed. Amenities such as walking paths, drainage, and shared dining spaces were also created. The city also installed fencing for the community. Donations helped to fund many of these projects. Other community resources soon followed, such as a library, garden, and tool shed.

In 2017, Portland Fire & Rescue began to provide residents with fire extinguishers, smoke detectors, and performed safety inspections. They also worked to clear all brush within 20 feet of the village, reducing the risk of fire to the site.

In 2018, the city planned to move the community to a shelter in St. Johns, citing the current location between a hill and a busy road as being dangerous. That year, a representative of the mayor's office stated that the city had spent $52,000 supplying the camp with amenities. The timeline for relocation was pushed back to late 2019. It never fully materialized, as city planners realized there was not enough space to support the population.

In 2021, there were 16 full-time residents. It was estimated that services cost the city $1,500 a month. In January, the city announced that it would cut-off services, such as trash pickup and portable toilet facilities, from the community. They claimed that environmental hazards were too big of a risk to keep the site inhabited. Residents were to move to a new sanctioned encampment in St. Johns, called St. Johns Village. By February, the city decided to continue providing services to Hazelnut Grove. Although they cut funding to landscaping, storage, and fencing services, the city continued to provide sanitary stations and trash pickup. The mayor's office stated that those services would remain for as long as residents continued to camp there.

Some Hazelnut Grove residents have chosen to relocate to St. Johns Village. Between 2015 and 2021, 40 campers had transitioned to permanent housing.

As of 2022, the village has continued to be occupied. One of Portland's two converted shipping containers offering safe day storage for homeless residents is located at and managed by the Hazelnut Grove camp.

== See also ==
- Dignity Village, another city-recognized legal encampment in Portland
