= Homelessness in the San Francisco Bay Area =

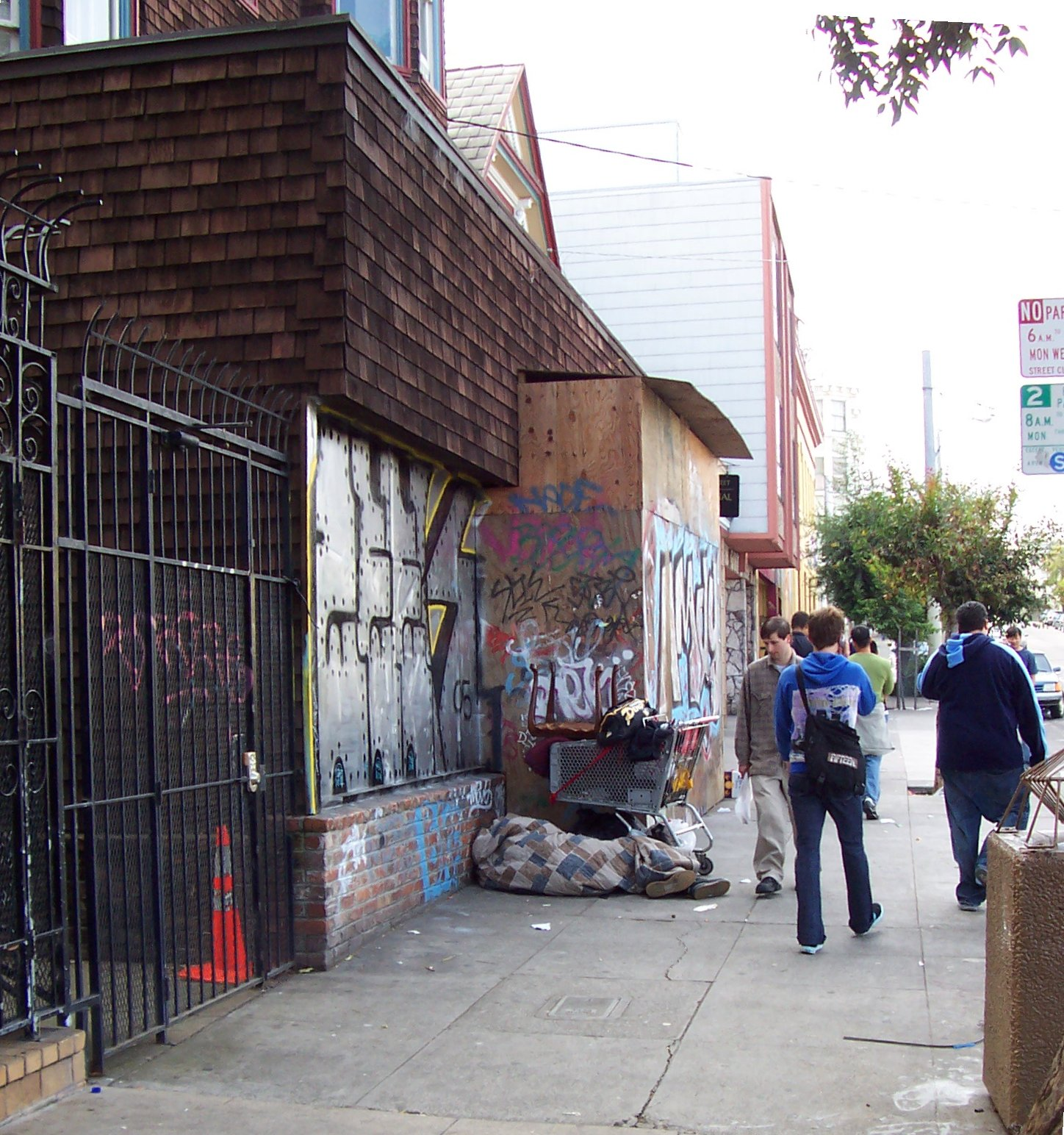
Homeless person on Church Street in San Francisco

The San Francisco Bay Area comprises nine northern California counties and contains five of the ten most expensive counties in the United States. Strong economic growth has created hundreds of thousands of new jobs, but coupled with severe restrictions on building new housing units, it has resulted in a statewide housing shortage which has driven rents to extremely high levels. The Sacramento Bee notes that large cities like San Francisco and Los Angeles both attribute their recent increases in homeless people to the housing shortage, with the result that homelessness in California overall has increased by 15% from 2015 to 2017. In September 2019, the Council of Economic Advisers released a report in which they stated that deregulation of the housing markets would reduce homelessness in some of the most constrained markets by estimates of 54% in San Francisco, 40 percent in Los Angeles, and 38 percent in San Diego, because rents would fall by 55 percent, 41 percent, and 39 percent respectively. In San Francisco, a minimum wage worker would have to work approximately 4.7 full-time jobs to be able to spend less than 30% of their income on renting a two-bedroom apartment.

San Francisco has had several thousand homeless people, despite extensive efforts by the city government to address the issue. San Francisco's dense, compact development pattern, its comparative lack of vacant land (i.e., beneath freeways, alongside creeks), and its high volumes of pedestrians tend to limit homeless encampments to the city's sidewalks and are thus more readily visible to the general public. This dramatically larger prevalence of visible homelessness in the city, relative to other large US cities, is widely noted by visitors and residents. As of 2018, this had begun to impact the city's largest industry, tourism (a $9 billion industry), as one large doctors' group has decided to move their annual convention elsewhere after members' concerns about threatening behavior, mental illness, and assault on one of their board members.

The number of people in poverty in the San Francisco Bay Area grew from 573,333 (8.6%) in 2000 to 668,876 (9.7%) in 2006–2010. While poverty rates vary greatly across the SF Bay area, in 2015, the Silicon Valley Institute for Regional Studies published that the poverty rate was 11.3%, having a slight downward trend from 12%; however, it was still above the historical average rate of 9%.

== Historical background ==
=== Emergence in the late 1970s and early 1980s ===
The prevalence of homelessness grew both in San Francisco and throughout the United States in the late 1970s and early '80s. Jennifer Wolch identifies some of these factors to include the loss of jobs from deindustrialization, a rapid rise in housing prices, and the elimination of social welfare programs. The Reagan Administration made large cutbacks on affordable and public housing programs, such as Section 8, leaving much of the task of providing public and supportive housing up to states and other local jurisdictions. The economic shift from production oriented jobs in factories towards the service industry resulted in a loss of wages as factory jobs were more lucrative. This wage decrease was compounded by the fact house prices continued to rise, with average real estate value in the Bay Area increasing by 100% between 1984 and 1990. As these economic changes were occurring, social events also impacted the city's homeless population. The deinstitutionalization movement of the 1970s had succeeded and saw the mass transfer of mental health patients to community-based clinics. This transfer was not smooth, as many previously institutionalized patients found themselves back in society with less support than they were accustomed to and few possessed the professional skills or resources needed to successfully transition. The failure of deinstitutionalization is often attributed to the cuts to mental health services made at the same time, with mental health budgets decreasing by a third between 1978 and 1982. As a result, the homeless population has had a disproportionate rate of mental health needs met ever since the '80s.

=== Feinstein years (1978–1988) ===
Dianne Feinstein was the first mayor of San Francisco forced to address the homeless issue. Her administration operated under the belief that the growing homeless problem was temporary and a side effect of the recent recession. The response to the problem was to open temporary shelters that provided a sandwich and a bed for a night, hoping that those served could find permanent housing soon. This program proved to be underfunded and unprepared for the demand, as the homeless population continued to grow.

=== Agnos administration (1988–1992) ===
Feinstein's successor, Art Agnos, took a more involved approach to addressing the homeless problem as part of a broader progressive mayoral campaign. Agnos' view of homelessness was that it was the result of structural inequalities and could only be resolved by intervention from state welfare programs. Under his direction, two multi-service buildings that provided mental health counseling and substance abuse support in addition to housing were opened to benefit the homeless community.

==== Camp Agnos ====
Despite Agnos' official support for homeless people, his administration was not without some controversy. A group of young anarcho-activists, Food Not Bombs, began to distribute free vegetarian meals to homeless people in parks around the Haight, which was opposed by a group representing developers and business interests. Tensions between activists—who argued they were just providing aid to the residents whom the city refused to support—and the city eventually escalated, with the city arresting activists and confiscating their supplies. Clashes between the city and activists continued off and on over the following year until confrontations over the usage of Civic Center Plaza escalated to the occupation of the park by a mix of activists and members from the homeless community estimated to number between 300 and 350 in all and eventually became known as "Camp Agnos". Complaints from the protesters included the city's inaction to address the growing homelessness, lack of affordable housing options, and the ineffectiveness of existing shelters. One homeless protester said of the services provided, "A shelter is like being in prison. There's no freedom of movement" and complained of the inability of being able to use shelters with her husband, opting instead to sleep on the streets so they could be together. Under pressure from the Board of Supervisors and the negative publicity, Agnos ordered police to ticket and arrest those who remained in Camp Agnos.

=== Jordan crackdown (1992–1996) ===
Former police chief Frank Jordan won the 1992 mayoral race on a platform of bringing public order back to the city and promised to return public space back to its residents from homeless people and youth activists. Jordan sought to crack down on the disorderly and troublesome activists who he thought were dealt with too leniently by the former administration. Jordan's four years saw 700 arrests and citations given to the Food Not Bombs activists.

==== Matrix program ====
Jordan's homeless policy extended beyond confronting Food Not Bombs members and their homeless allies. Jordan introduced the Matrix Program, which expanded the police's role in tackling homelessness by increasing the number of citations given to homeless people for city misdemeanors, with 6,000 citations issued in the first six months of the program's initiation. Matrix teams of city police usually accompanied by social service workers to systematically sweep the city block by block to engage homeless people and dismantle homeless encampments. The initial reception from city residents was mostly positive with 75% of calls to the Mayor's office praising the crackdown as a needed step to clean the city up.

Critics of Matrix accused the program of using resources on punitive enforcement of quality of life laws that generally only affect the homeless community, like sleeping in public and loitering, instead of promoting services to aid homeless people. Mass citations to homeless people, critics argued, were counter-productive since those in extreme poverty lacked the funds to pay the fines. Judges would respond to unpaid fines by issuing arrest warrants, resulting in the incarceration of homeless people when the same resources used to jail the inmates could instead go towards expanding shelter services. Additional critiques lobbied at the program centered around the use of police as social service workers. Matrix police were authorized to give psychological field tests to determine if a homeless person was acting erratically and were the deciding force on whether or not to bring them to the hospital for mental services. In 1994, homeless rights advocates succeeded in convincing the board of supervisors to pass a resolution opposing the Matrix Program, with Jordan's response being to double down by expanding the program's sweeps to Golden Gate Park. Though the Matrix program persisted, public opinion shifted against it for being too harsh and Jordan failed to secure a second term.

=== Willie Brown (1996–2004) ===
Willie Brown, San Francisco's first African-American mayor, won a run-off against Frank Jordan with a campaign promise to end the Matrix Program. Upon assuming office, Brown suspended the Matrix Program and ordered a judge to revoke all citations and warrants stemming from the program. Despite this action to end Matrix, citations issued to the homeless community for quality of life violations, a highly criticized aspect of Matrix, increased. The last year of Matrix saw 11,000 such citations, which rose to 16,000 in Brown's first year and soared to 23,000 by 1999.

The militarized clearance of homeless people's encampments within Golden Gate Park, which had an estimated population of 1,000 throughout the park and featured the deployment of police helicopters equipped with infra-red cameras, demonstrated Brown's commitment to his promise: "You tell me where the camp is, and in 24 hours it won't be there". These citations were less publicized than Jordan's Matrix program and considered to be routine policing instead of any homeless oriented policy, allowing Brown to avoid some of the negative publicity that plagued his predecessor. Not all of Brown's positions were detrimental to the homeless community as he successfully mobilized support to secure a $100 million government bond (equivalent to $200 million in 2025) to expand affordable housing and his support for universal healthcare was a central tenet to his platform, though its implementation was never manifested.

Riding a robust economy and operating under a patronage system that benefited his allies and restricted political opponents, Brown was able to secure a second term despite policies that alienated his liberal base, including his harsher-than-expected treatment of the city's homeless.

=== Gavin Newsom (2004–2010) ===
Gavin Newsom, a previous member of the San Francisco Board of Supervisors, succeeded Brown after running as a Democratic centrist to become San Francisco's youngest mayor in the past century. Given the ineffective steps taken to address homelessness over the past two decades, Newsom sought to implement wholesale change in how the city interacted with its homeless community as he thought programs needed more resources and oversight. With Newsom's support, the city passed two measures, propositions M and N, to change homeless policy. Proposition M expanded quality of life laws to include the prohibition of "aggressive" panhandling and panhandling near ATMs, parking lots, or buses. Though this was another quality of life law and included citations, priorities were made to funnel offenders to substance use or mental health treatment as much as possible.

==== Care Not Cash (Prop N) ====
A cornerstone of Newsom's homeless legislation was passed with his support while he was still on the Board of Supervisors in 2002. Proposition N, better known as Care Not Cash, was passed by the city with 60% approval to overhaul the city's welfare system by cutting General Assistance payments to eligible adults from $395 a month (one of the highest rates in California) to $57 a month and to use the savings to expand care services for the city's homeless residents. Newsom claimed that using resources for services would prove to be more effective at supporting homeless residents instead of handouts, arguing that cash handouts encouraged homeless people to flock to the city from neighboring counties, along with increased usage of emergency medical services and crime rates on the weekends the cash was dispersed. His claim that handouts cause crime rates to spike and increased hospitalization has been disputed by some academic studies conducted in San Francisco, which have found an inverse relationship between recipients of monetary subsidies and risky behaviors such as substance usage. Care Not Cash resulted in approximately 1,200 homeless people finding shelter via the usage of Single Room Occupancy (SRO) units in hotels throughout the city, however those that did not receive housing found life on the streets even more difficult due to the sharp funding cuts. Critics of the program accuse it of having exclusive standards to participate in, thereby excluding large segments of the homeless population, as well as using substandard SRO housing units, which often lack private bathrooms and food prep areas, as permanent housing.

==== Other programs ====
Other measures introduced included Homeward Bound and Operation Outreach, as well as new sit-lie ordinances.

Homeward Bound was a program to pay for bus tickets to send homeless people out of the city so long as they could prove they had a place to be received at their destination. This was met with resistance from critics like the Coalition for Homelessness who accused the program of not solving anything and was just dumping the problem off to other counties. Mayor Newsom argued that "the vast majority of people that are out on the sidewalks are not from San Francisco originally" and would be better served by being returned to supportive family members, although by 2007 San Francisco's homeless census found that only 31% percent of the homeless population became homeless outside of San Francisco. A 2017 Guardian study found that between 2013–2016, almost half of the 7,000 persons in San Francisco had claimed to have successfully moved out of homelessness had simply been moved out of San Francisco.

Operation Outreach was instituted in 2004 and, echoing some of the philosophies behind the Matrix program of the Jordan era, utilized police officers to enforce quality-of-life laws. This program differed from the Matrix program in that it involved a diverse number of agencies with the purpose of connecting the homeless community with services as the primary goal, with quality-of-life citations as a secondary result. The effectiveness of the outreach aspect of the program is disputable, as the Coalition found that only 24 of 204 people surveyed received a referral to a program or service in their last encounter with the police.

In his last year, Newsom expanded the quality of life laws within the city by successfully passing Proposition L in a public vote, which banned city residents from sitting or lying on sidewalks between 7 a.m. and 11 p.m.

In November 2023, the city started clearing away all of the homeless people from certain parts of the city in preparation for the upcoming Asia-Pacific Economic Cooperation summit. On 25 September, a high-ranking official from the city's Public Works department emailed to city officials listing seven intersections to target, writing that due to the upcoming summit, he was "concerned about historical encampments that are close to priority areas". The San Francisco Chronicle noted that "All seven intersections are in the two neighborhoods that have long been at the epicenter of San Francisco’s unrelenting crises of homelessness and public drug markets."

==== Coerced Mental Health Treatment ====
California Assembly Bill 2830 would have enabled cities and families to push people into court-ordered mental health treatment. A pivot away from the "housing first" strategy, critics have called the bill "misguided" and "immoral". A companion bill to SB 1338 would set up "CARE courts", aimed at expanding the bureaucracy of service provision to include judges and lawyers, and includes sanctions for cities that do not comply with the program.

=== London Breed (2018-2025) ===
Mayor London Breed, elected in 2018 and reelected in 2019, expressed progressive development plans for the unhoused community. Her policy was centered on increasing available, affordable units and protecting existing policies. She also worked on local policies to support safe drug use including fentanyl testing, clean needles, and the expansion of the San Francisco Street Overdose Team to include a dedicated team to support and follow up with people after overdose incidents. Her policies have also provided safe parking spaces for those residing in their vehicles.

Researchers and policy experts point out that local homelessness policies have been impacted significantly by structural factors like expensive housing, lack of housing opportunities, and coordination difficulties on a regional level. According to the literature, although city-level policies, like the ones mayor London Breed looked at, can enhance access to services and encourage harm reduction, reducing the number of homeless people requires sufficient housing at the regional and statewide levels.

=== COVID-19 Pandemic (2020–2023) ===
The Bay Area's housing landscape transformed during the COVID-19 pandemic, with a notable shift toward the Housing First (HF) approach. Unhoused populations were acutely impacted by the pandemic, being more vulnerable to exposure while living in encampments or on the streets. At the same time, the states homeless population was increasing due many individuals losing employment. The state allocated funds to house people living on the streets as a part of the state's response to COVID-19. "Project Roomkey", which spanned multiple counties in the Bay Area, was a state-funded program that provided temporary housing in hotels and trailers. This program proved successful in preventing the spread of COVID-19 and facilitating vaccine distribution.

Project Roomkey's success showcased the efficacy of the state in executing "housing first" projects. In the United States, there is precedent for collaboration between government agencies during times of emergency. Project Roomkey demonstrated an effective collaboration between public and private entities. This method is increasingly popular in the public health sector.

There were disparities in program accessibility, with a majority of participants being white, despite people of color forming a significant unhoused population. Additionally, the housing program served fewer women and Trans/Non-binary people than men.

The success of Project Roomkey and Rehousing Strategy laid the groundwork for the Homekey grant program, administered by the California Department of Housing and Community Development (HCD). Homekey, building upon the proven model, created opportunities for agencies to acquire various structures, including hotels, motels, apartments, and other buildings. This initiative aims to provide long-term housing solutions for individuals experiencing or at risk of homelessness. Homekey's innovative approach involves converting commercial properties and existing buildings into permanent or interim housing, encompassing diverse structures such as hotels, motels, hostels, single-family homes, multifamily apartments, adult residential facilities, and manufactured homes. The use of hotels paid for by the state also helped hotel business stay afloat during an era of no travel.

== Public opinion ==
=== Trends in concern ===
Annual opinion polling by the Public Policy Institute of California (PPIC) indicates that the intensity of concern about homelessness has declined in recent years. In the San Francisco Bay Area, the share of residents who said they were "very concerned" about the presence of homeless people in their community fell from 63% in 2019 to 28% in 2025, while 76% said they were either "very concerned" or "somewhat concerned" in 2025. PPIC’s October 2025 statewide survey similarly found that 78% of California adults were at least "somewhat concerned" about homelessness in their local community, while the share "very concerned" declined from 58% (November 2019) to 37% (October 2025).

== Homelessness estimates ==
The U.S. Department of Housing and Urban Development (HUD) estimated that 771,480 people experienced homelessness in the United States on a single night in January 2024. Reports citing the 2024 point-in-time count list California as having 187,084 people experiencing homelessness on a single night in 2024 (about 28% of the national total).

In Santa Clara County, California, a January 2025 point-in-time count recorded 10,711 people experiencing homelessness countywide (an increase from 9,903 in 2023). The City of San José reported 6,503 homeless residents, including about 60% unsheltered (3,959 people), based on point-in-time count data cited in 2025 reporting.

== Causes of homelessness ==
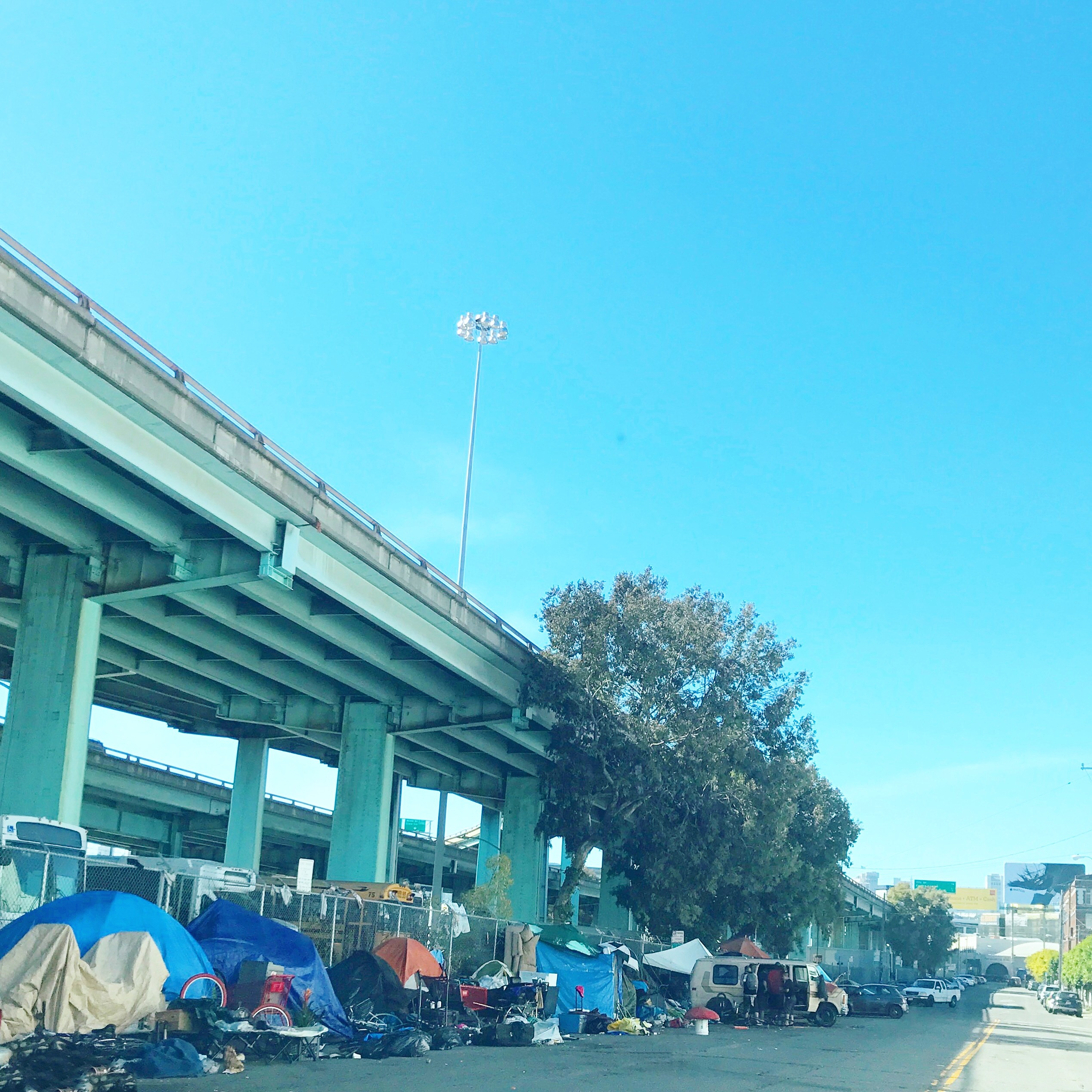
Homeless tents under the freeway in San Francisco, 2017

One of the primary causes of homelessness in the Bay Area is an insufficient supply of affordable housing. Mass homelessness has several contributing factors, including: "Economic Dislocation", "Reduced Social Safety Nets", "Failed Housing Policy", "Mass Incarceration", "Family Instability", and other "Individual Causes" including mental health and physical wellness. Reasons cited for homelessness in the 2019 survey commissioned by the City of San Francisco include job loss (26%), alcohol/drug use (18%), eviction (13%), argument/asked to leave by friend/family (12%), mental health issues (8%), and divorce/separation (5%). 70% of people homeless in San Francisco in 2019 reported most recently becoming homeless while living in San Francisco: 22% came from another county within California, and 8% came from another state. However, of the 70% who had become homeless while living in San Francisco, 45% had only been in San Francisco for ten years or less, and 6% had only been in San Francisco for one year or less. Reasons for coming from outside San Francisco at the time of homelessness include seeking a job (25%), LGBTQ acceptance (11%), accessing homeless services (22%), was visiting and decided to stay (17%), accessing VA services or clinic (5%), and family/friends are here (13%).

=== Great Depression ===
In the 1930s the Great Depression caused widespread poverty, hunger, and homelessness, particularly in industry-dependent cities, such as San Francisco.

Two million homeless people migrated across the United States in search of jobs and housing, especially on the West Coast. The number of people without homes grew in the 1980s in San Francisco, as wages stagnated and funding for welfare reform was cut, eliminating the social safety net.

=== Housing crisis ===
Since the 1960s, San Francisco and the surrounding Bay Area have enacted strict zoning regulations that have suppressed the number of new homes. Among other restrictions, San Francisco does not allow buildings over 40 feet tall in most of the city and has passed laws making it easier for residents to block developments. Partly as a result of these codes, from 2007 to 2014, the Bay Area issued building permits for only half the number of needed houses, based on the area's population growth.

In September 2019, the Council of Economic Advisers released a report in which they stated that deregulation of the housing markets would reduce homelessness in some of the most constrained markets by estimates of 54% in San Francisco, 40% in Los Angeles, and 38% in San Diego, because rents would fall by 55%, 41%, and 39% respectively.

In 2002, the San Francisco Planning Department launched the Eastern Neighborhoods Community Planning Process to resolve recognized land use conflicts in several SF neighborhoods. Many stakeholders in these neighborhoods oversaw the planning process, which was focused on the rezoning of historically industrial lands for new residential uses, but was unresponsive to neighborhood concerns of unaffordable housing, residential and job displacement, gentrification, public safety, and inadequate open space. Only those who could afford these limited new housing units were able to access housing, causing socioeconomically disadvantaged and ethnic minority groups to either seek housing in under-resourced neighborhoods of San Francisco such as the Tenderloin or lose housing completely, leading to poor health outcomes for marginalized populations. Adopted in 2008, the plan banned housing development in large areas to preserve land for light industrial uses. Since it was adopted, both homelessness and the housing crisis have worsened.

=== Gentrification and displacement ===
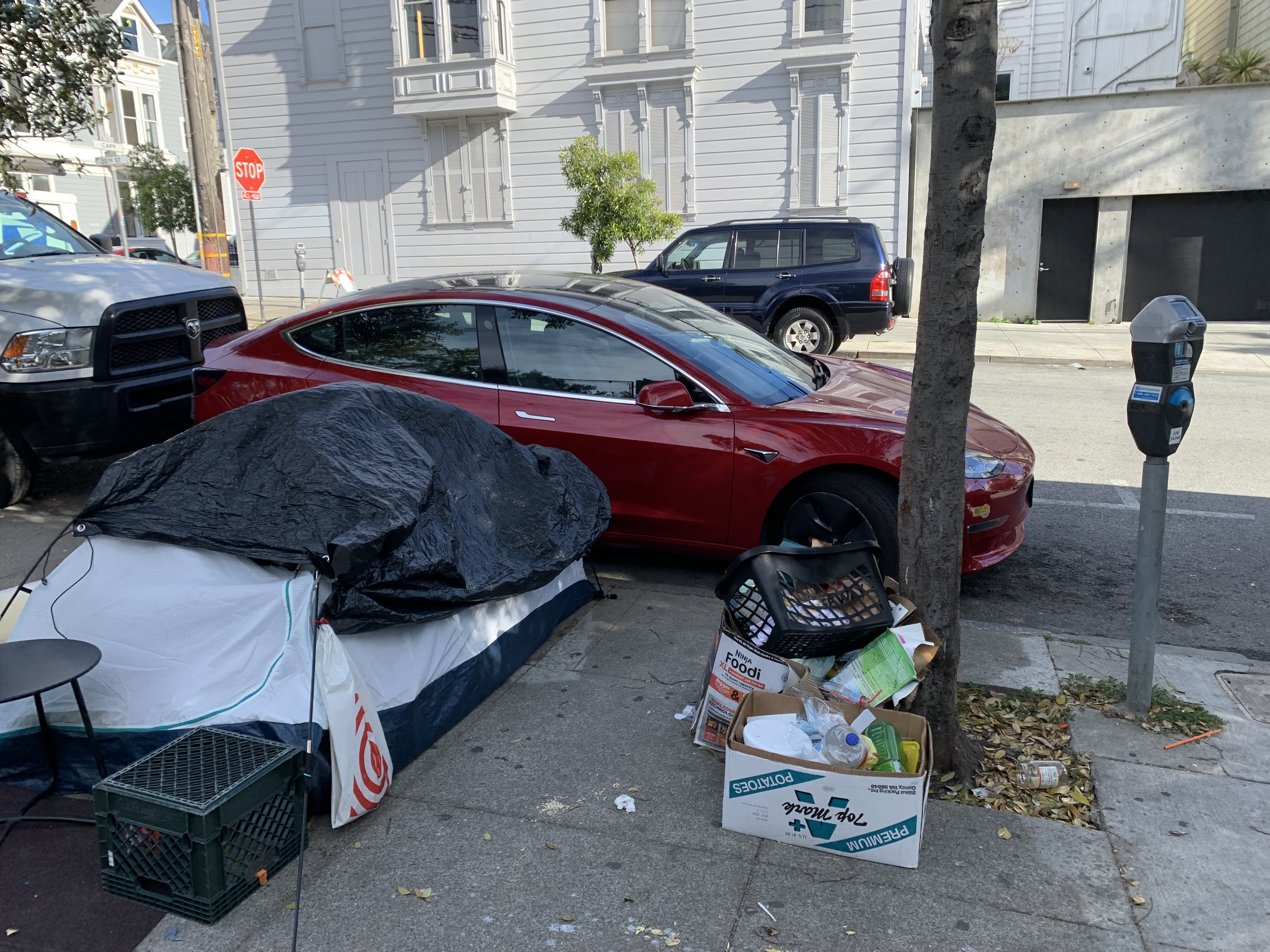
Homeless person in front of a parked Tesla in the Mission District in 2022.

Gentrification in the San Francisco Bay Area has been a major concern. A research and action initiative of UC Berkeley in collaboration with researchers at UCLA and Portland State University has produced The Urban Displacement Project to "[examine] the relationships between investment, neighborhood change, gentrification, and displacement." This study indicates rising levels of segregation in relation to increasing income inequality in the SF Bay Area. A mapping tool has been developed through the project to track displacement and gentrification in the San Francisco Bay Area.

With the emergence of a "new" Oakland, the African American population has decreased significantly from 2000 to 2010. During this period, there has been a push to kick out homeless people from government-funded housing which has further led many landlords to stop renting to Section 8 tenants in hopes of getting higher rents. According to a report done in 2015, 41% of homeless people who were surveyed in Oakland became homeless after age 50 which is likely due to rising housing prices and loss of safety nets.

The ongoing gentrification in the SF Bay area is deepening structural divisions. The rapid economic growth of the tech industry in San Francisco and nearby Silicon Valley has created hundreds of thousands of new jobs. The resultant high demand for housing, combined with the lack of supply, (caused by severe restrictions on the building of new housing units) has caused dramatic increases in rents and extremely high housing prices, adding to the already developing housing crisis. For example, from 2012 to 2017, the San Francisco metropolitan area added 400,000 new jobs, but only 60,000 new housing units.

Even though real income rates in the Bay Area have been increasing over time, it was published in 2011 by the American Journal of Economics and Sociology that low-income residents are left with less leftover income after their rental payments than the equivalent in the 1960s.

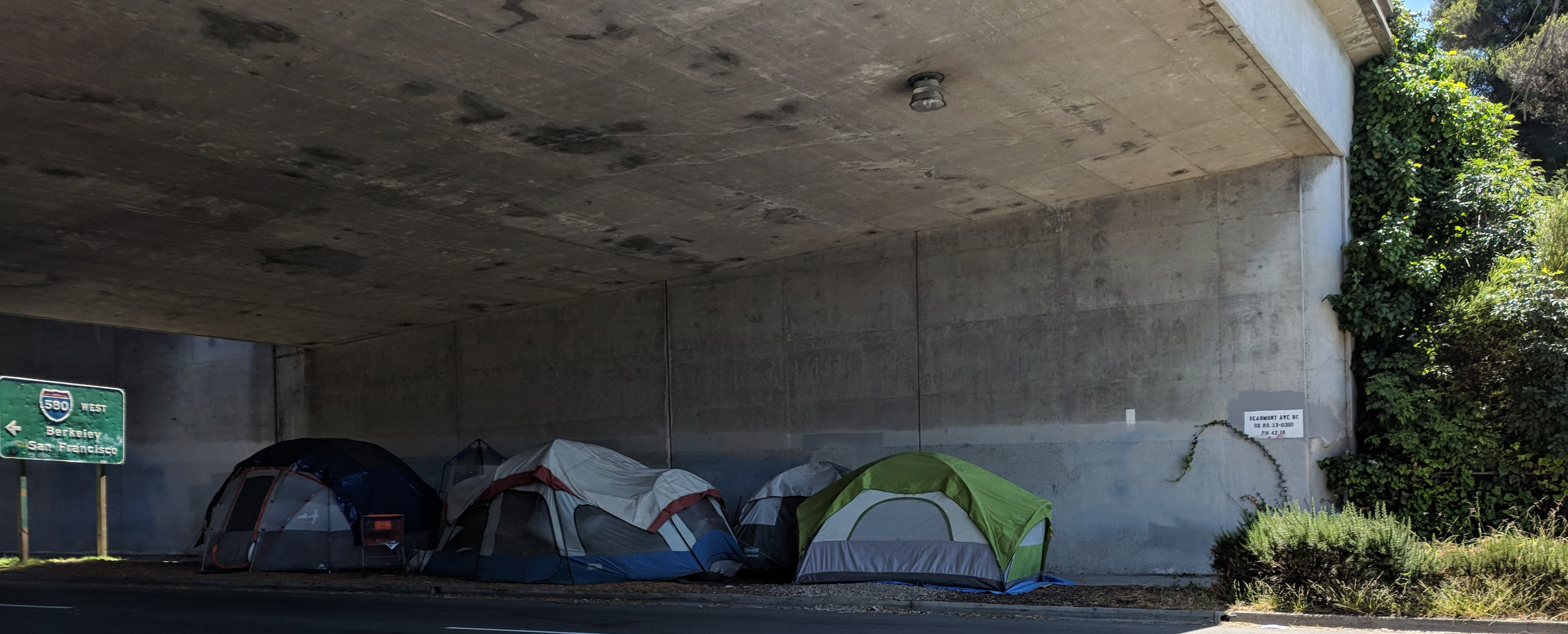
A small tent city under an overpass carrying Interstate 580 in Oakland

Additionally, gentrification affects the health outcomes of individuals and families being displaced. Melody Tullier's research identifies that as rates of gentrification in Alameda County grew between 2005 and 2013, low-tract census populations had an increase in incidents of preventable mortality, specifically due to suicide, homicide, diabetes, HIV, and nutritional deficiencies.

By the end of 2000, gentrification in San Francisco grew to the center of political and organizing activity. Anti-displacement advocates received success in gaining representation in SF's Planning Department and in advancing new regulations (e.g., inclusionary zoning) to protect and create affordable housing, which led to a shift from citywide to district legislative elections to address neighborhood concerns at the city level.

On January 18, 2016, Martin Luther King Jr. Day, in response to issues of gentrification the Black Seed Collective coordinated a Black Lives Matter movement protest blocking all westbound traffic on the Bay Bridge that connects Oakland and San Francisco. During this protest, they demanded for "the immediate divestment of city funds for policing and investment in sustainable, affordable housing so Black, Brown, and Indigenous people can remain in their hometowns of Oakland and San Francisco."

=== Exclusionary zoning policies ===
In the 1960s, San Francisco and surrounding Bay Area cities enacted strict zoning regulations. Zoning is the legal restriction of parts of a city to particular uses, such as residential, industrial, or commercial. In San Francisco, it also includes limitations on building height, density, and shape, and banning the demolition of old buildings. Zoning was originally executed as a public health prevention policy to ensure industrial emissions are separated from residential areas but has since been manipulated by homeowners to artificially drive up the price of housing.

The housing crisis is both a regional and local problem. Gentrification and exclusion are intimately related at a neighborhood level. If a high-demand, high-cost neighborhood won't build, developers and people looking for housing will be diverted to the nearest low-cost neighborhoods. That increases demand and development and leads to gentrification. Since the residents of high-cost, high-demand neighborhoods tend to have mobility, money, and access to information and power, they are hugely successful in leveraging land-use policies to exclude newcomers.

Exclusionary zoning policies in San Francisco in city planning have caused a divide in affordability and accessibility for housing. The anti-development orientation of certain cities is turning them into preserves for the wealthy as housing costs increase beyond what lower-income families can afford to pay, which displaces communities and residents of low-income areas, leading to rising rates of homelessness.

=== Redlining policies ===
Additionally, until 1968, the Federal Housing Administration (FHA) enforced an explicit redlining policy of racial discrimination in mortgage lending. Under redlining, racial minority groups were refused loans for mortgages. The policy incentivized homeowners to restrict the sale of houses to white families only, creating all-white neighborhoods. Although prohibited by the Fair Housing Act of 1968, the practice of neighborhood delineation based on race and class had a lasting impact, depriving certain neighborhoods of essential resources such as housing, schools, clinics, and grocery stores. The zoning policies created divisions within SF districts, widening the income inequality gap and polarizing resource accessibility and socioeconomic demographics, seen especially in the Tenderloin District, which currently experiences the highest rates of homelessness.

=== Insufficient housing ===
In a 2022 book titled "Homelessness is a Housing Problem," Clayton Page Aldern (a policy analyst and data scientist in Seattle) and Gregg Colburn (an assistant professor of real estate at the University of Washington’s College of Built Environments) studied per capita homelessness rates across the country along with what possible factors might be influencing the rates and found that high rates of homelessness are caused by shortages of affordable housing, not by mental illness, drug addiction, or poverty.

They found that mental illness, drug addiction, and the use of those who live in poverty occur nationwide, but not all places have equally expensive housing costs. One example cited is that two states with high rates of opioid addiction, Arkansas and West Virginia, both have low per capita rates of homelessness, because of low housing prices. With respect to poverty, the city of Detroit is one of the poorest cities, yet Detroit's per capita homelessness rate is 20% of that of West Coast cities like Seattle, Portland, San Francisco, Los Angeles, and San Diego.

== Prevalence and visibility by city ==
In what is commonly referred to as a variation on Greyhound therapy, many cities in the United States, including the city of San Francisco, buy homeless persons free one-way bus tickets to reduce the visibility of homeless populations within the city. This has been occurring over the last three decades. From 2010 to 2017, an estimated "20,000 homeless people have been sent to and from within the mainland US". There have been numerous reports and lawsuits between cities regarding homeless and patient dumping especially in cases where the person's destination either A) has fewer homeless support and homeless-exiting programs than San Francisco and/or B) where the destination city has staff at the inbound bus terminal issuing similar one-way tickets back out to San Francisco or any other city in the U.S.

Homeless people are also a visual reminder for the Bay Area of the increasing struggles of homeless people with impoverishment due to the high cost of living as they particularly occupy common public spaces frequented by the middle and upper classes.

=== San Francisco ===
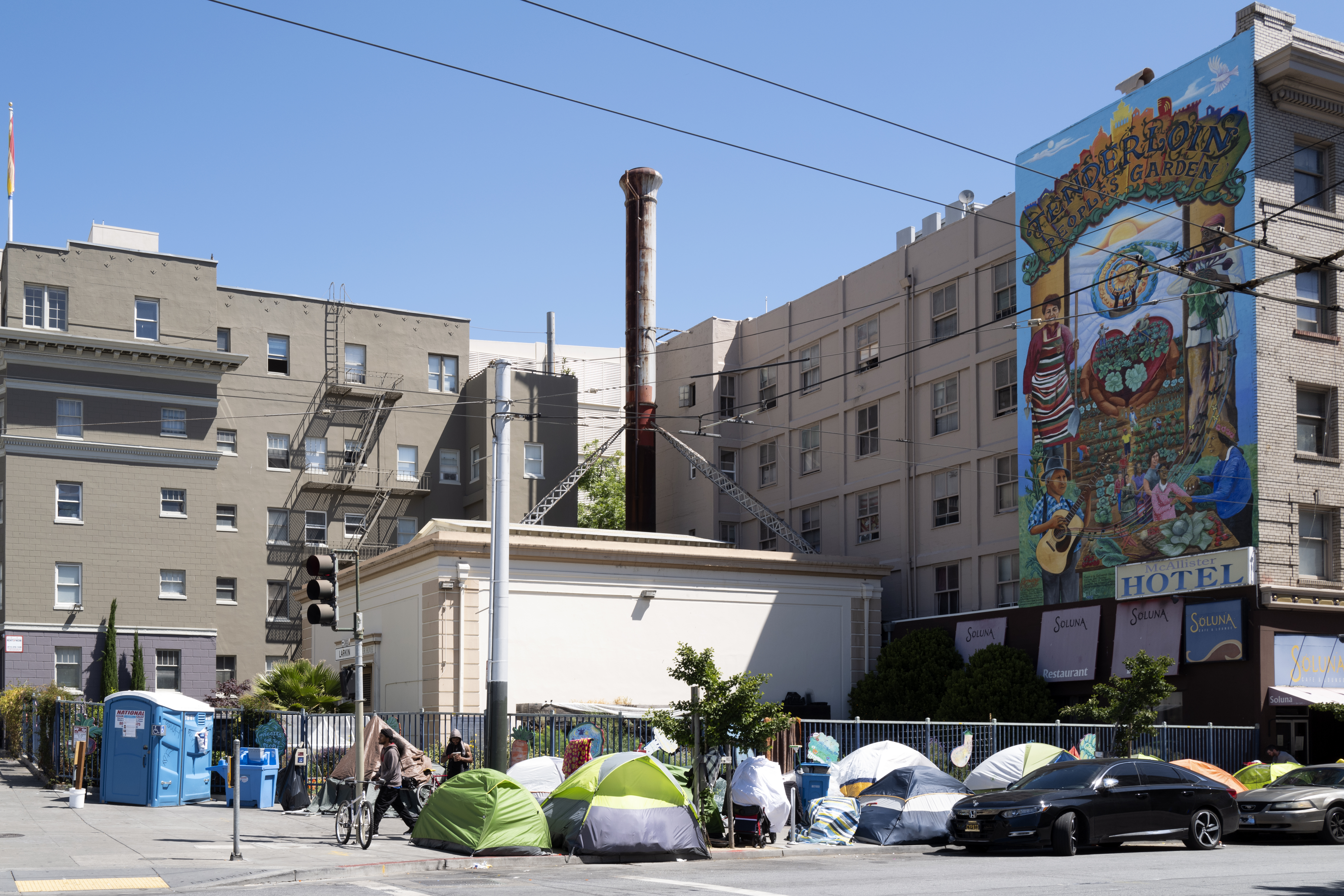
Homeless encampment in San Francisco, May 2020

As of 2019, the city was believed to have approximately 8,035 homeless residents, 5,180 of whom are unsheltered. In March 2019, Saúl Hidalgo, the director of housing and shelter programs at the nonprofit Dolores Street Community Services, said that there were at most 3,000 homeless children in the district, with most of them attending the San Francisco Unified School District. As of 2019, approximately 70% of the city's homeless had housing in the city before becoming homeless, while the remaining 30% came from outside of San Francisco. This figure is up from 61% in 2013. Of that 70%, 55% had lived in San Francisco for less than 10 years before becoming homeless; 6% had only lived in San Francisco for a year before becoming homeless. By 2016, according to a report by urban planning and research organization SPUR, San Francisco had the third highest per capita homelessness rate (0.8%) of all large US cities, as well as the third highest percentage of unsheltered homeless (55%).

In 2018, San Francisco's homeless camps drew scrutiny from a UN special rapporteur, Leilani Farha, who visited different camps and spoke to residents. Farha compared the conditions she witnessed to those of Mumbai, stating: "...I'm sorry, California is a rich state, by any measures, the United States is a rich country, and to see these deplorable conditions that the government is allowing, by international human rights standards, it's unacceptable. I'm guided by human rights law." She also decried the city for conducting "tent sweeps" whereby encampments are cleared: "It's damaging because they always have to move. They're treated like nonentities. Sometimes they say [belongings are] put in storage, but more often they'll dump everyone's possessions into one dumpster. It's horrible. It's not dignified. The people have nowhere to go. It's illogical. It's tragic."

=== Racial demographics ===
A much higher proportion of survey respondents identified as Black, African American, or African (35% compared to 6-7%), a much lower proportion of survey respondents identified as Asian or Asian American (7% compared to 37%), and a slightly lower percentage identified as White (42% compared to 51%), although the non-Hispanic white population is around 40%. Most survey respondents identified as either White (42%) or Black, African American, or African (35%). 6% are Native compared to roughly one percent of the city's population, and 5% are Native Hawaiian/Pacific Islander compared to a scant 0.5-1% of the city's population. 42% are White.

=== Richmond ===
As of 2017, the Richmond Police Department (RPD) have noted at least 76 encampments and about 800 people living homeless. About 50% of homeless residents lost their Richmond homes and ended up on the streets. According to the City of Richmond's memo on Homelessness Policies and Initiatives, "Richmond is already Contra Costa County’s predominant location for homeless shelter beds." With a population of about 110,000 people, about 9.7% of the total population of the Contra Costa County, Richmond is a 55.4% contributor to Contra Costa County homeless shelter beds. Homeless people from across the Bay Area are sent to Richmond shelters, making it hard for the City of Richmond to deal with the city's own homeless population.

=== Berkeley ===
People's Park was until 2024 home to many community members of Berkeley's large homeless population due to a long history of student advocacy, free speech riots, and protests against the University of California, Berkeley in the iconic university-owned public park. Several of the largest homeless encampments in Berkeley, comprising approximately 131 residents, were swept in the spring and summer of 2021. Efforts have been made to build temporary transitional shelters with input from the community for those who live in tent encampments. A local newspaper Berkeleyside reported that an unhoused person "found [one such shelter] to be similar to a 'concentration camp,' a sentiment expressed by several other homeless people."

=== Oakland ===
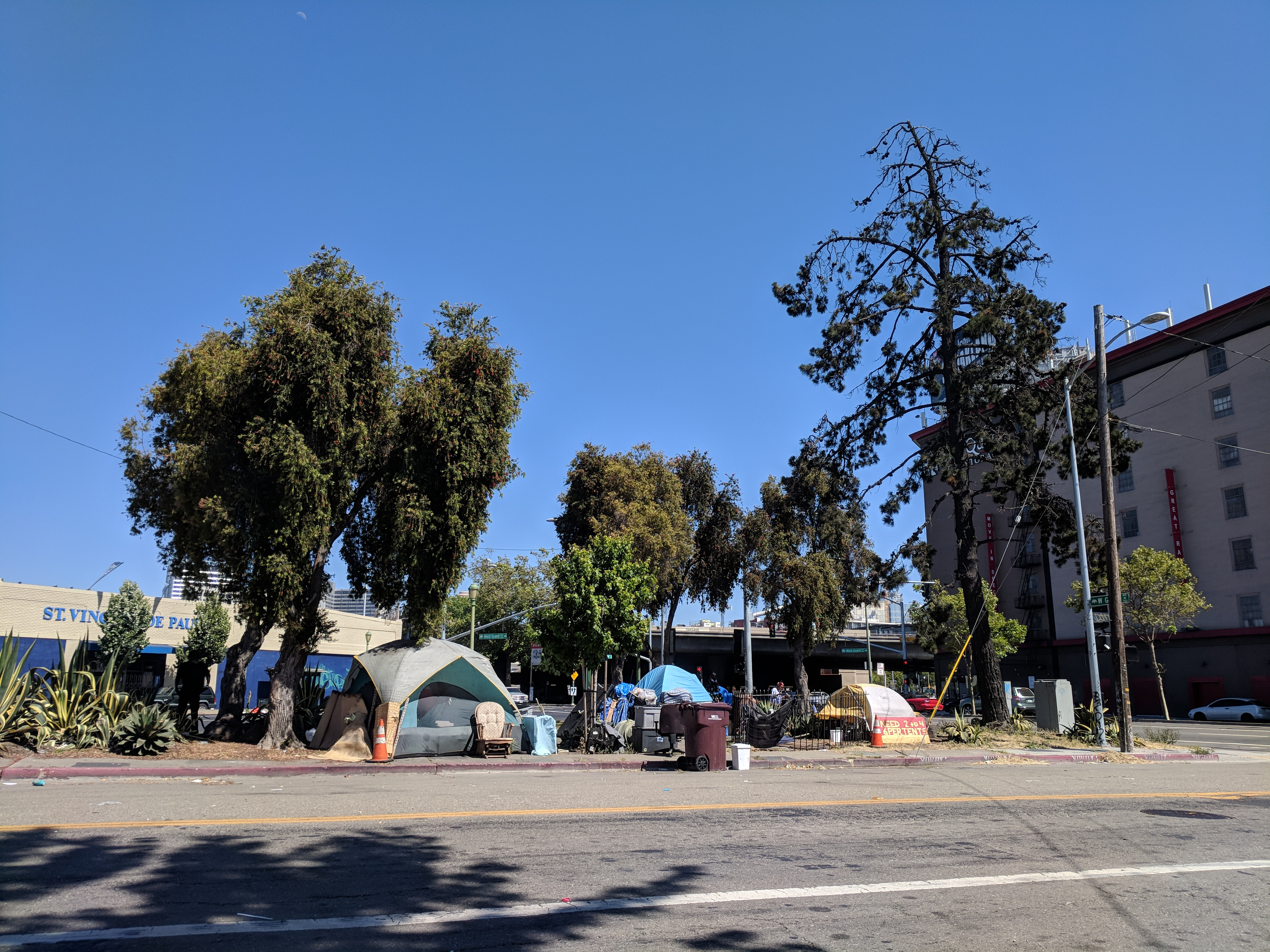
A tent city in Oakland, June 2018

In 2016, the Oakland City Council declared a shelter crisis. Although, no action was taken beyond this declaration to address the problem. Programs such as Keep Oakland Housed help homeless people by providing current tenants with case managers that help them apply to programs that would benefit them financially. These programs include lowering phone bill costs and providing mental health counseling. Restoration of Lake Merritt, a significant landmark in Oakland has affected the lives of many who are homeless and live there. Though politicians thought that the renovation of Oakland by restoring Lake Merritt would help the city, creating more space for homes, 80% of existing Oakland households were unable to afford the prices of these new luxury buildings. The effect was a clear strengthening of gentrification of that area.

=== San Jose ===
San Jose's largest homeless encampment was known as The Jungle; when it was dismantled in 2014, it was thought to be the largest encampment in the United States, covering 60 to 65 acres (24 to 26 ha) near Coyote Creek with up to 175 residents. The city was home to an estimated 4,000 homeless in 2016; of those, approximately 500 were thought to be living out of their cars, while many others were believed to seek shelter along trails and creeks.

=== Santa Rosa ===
In 2019, the Joe Rodota Trail in Santa Rosa had the largest homeless encampment in the history of Sonoma County, but was dispersed in January 2020, with some of its inhabitants relocating to other areas of Sonoma County. Homeless encampments often shift in Santa Rosa and surrounding areas but are often found near downtown, especially along the West End neighborhood, and small streets along Santa Rosa Avenue have small trailer and tent populations. There are over 2,700 homeless people in Sonoma County, 0.6% of the county's population. Much of the homeless situation in Sonoma County also is found in Petaluma, Rohnert Park, Sebastopol, and especially in terms of per capita, the Russian River area that focuses on Guerneville is roughly 4-5% homeless.

== Experiences of being unhoused ==
=== Health and healthcare ===
Homeless populations are especially susceptible to physical and mental ill-health due to their lack of shelter and social safety nets. Not only are homeless populations more exposed to infectious diseases, injuries, and psychosocial pressures that lead to mental health issues, but they also rarely receive adequate care from the San Francisco area healthcare system. As victims of social and structural disenfranchisement, many displaced individuals resort to drug use and drug-related social communities as coping strategies. Homelessness in San Francisco is correlated with increased rates of substance abuse—methamphetamine, black-tar heroin, and crack cocaine were the most common illegal drugs found on San Francisco streets in 2018. A cycle of poverty and substance use contribute to the growth of the homeless population, and many homeless feel that they cannot escape.

Homelessness has additional negative consequences within the Bay Area such as risky sex, urination, and defecation in public areas and on the streets, use of emergency room visits as a way to get housed, and health problems.

Approximately 20% of the patients who end up in the Bay Area emergency rooms are homeless or have been housing insecure in the previous two months, and 13.8% were living in homeless shelters or on the streets. In the past 12 months, 15.5% of them had spent a night in a shelter, 30.5% had previously been homeless, 25.4% were at risk of becoming homeless in the next two months, and 9.1% had been evicted in the past year. Homeless people are prone to a much higher rate of visiting the emergency department due to mental health issues. Reported obstacles in treating mental health like supportive housing has impacted the healthcare cost and usage.

=== Drug use ===
San Francisco's homeless youth experience high rates of psychiatric disorders and substance use and have been known to use the following substances: cannabis, cocaine, narcotics (heroin and methadone) and stimulants (methamphetamine and amphetamine). Homelessness has been associated as a predictor of the use of heroin and recent nonfatal overdose among street-recruited injection heroin users in the San Francisco Bay Area, calling for more targeted interventions to decrease this risk association. Certain neighborhoods have been documented as being littered with drug syringes, trash, and feces, resulting in a level of contamination "...much greater than communities in Brazil or Kenya". The city spends approximately 30 million dollars per year on the removal of feces and contaminated needles. Of the 400,000 needles distributed monthly, San Francisco receives around 246,000 back — meaning that there are roughly 150,000 discarded needles unaccounted for each month - or nearly 2 million per year.

After a visit to San Francisco's homeless camps in January 2018, United Nations special rapporteur Leilani Farha stated that the belief that drug abuse was a root cause of homelessness was not generally true, that the reverse is more prevalent, whereby "Most people on the streets are living with some sort of 'structural trauma,' meaning they have lost their job, can't afford housing, been evicted by a landlord. The structural trauma causes deeply personal effects that can lead to living on the street that triggers drug use." Structural forces are then obscured by the stigma of homelessness. Stigma impacts the fates of homeless people by making them an "other" which in turn strengthens power dynamics.

=== Access to services ===
In the San Francisco Bay Area, people experiencing homelessness find many obstacles while trying to get healthcare, housing resources, and social services. Researching the 2023 study by the Benioff Homelessness and Housing Initiative at UCSF, the California Statewide Study of 'People Experiencing homelessness found that there is a lack of accessibility to the services, regardless of whether they are even there or not, due to the long waiting lists, requirements to provide documentation, and the complicated nature of public programs.

According to research on administrative burdens, many public programs create learning and compliance costs, and psychological burdens for the underserved populations, and this primarily impacts low-income individuals. These factors being discussed also restrict participation in public programs for those who are also eligible. For unhoused individuals, public program requirements also cross with various challenges like chronic health problems, unstable employment, and also no reliable support network, shown as an example during the times of Covid 19.

The UCSF study also found that with these unhoused populations, the biggest barriers to access are experienced by non-English speaking communities and disabled communities, proving the issue seems to be with the limited outreach and language barriers that connect the availability of the many programs. The Public Policy Institute of California has documented many years, decades, of housing supply shortfall and affordability pressure across the state that strained the capacity of local service systems, leaving low-income residents with less exits from homelessness.

== Crime within homeless community ==
Crime and violence within tent cities and homeless communities, including rival homeless encampments and individuals, has been an issue amongst homeless populations in the Bay Area and in North America. In 2021, news reports of a 39-year-old homeless man allegedly assaulting two elderly people in Market Street, San Francisco made headlines. It was initially reported by news sources that it had racial overtones, although a public defender denounced this. A stabbing of two elderly women, wounding them, occurred at a bus stop later that May.

There have been notable cases of homeless-on-housed people crimes that received higher press. The killing of Nia Wilson, an 18-year-old woman on a BART train, by a homeless 27-year-old man with severe mental illness, was an incident that brought concern over homelessness, mental illness, racial issues and violence within the community.

== Current efforts to address the issue by region ==
The creative communication strategies and practices of the Coalition on Homelessness, Poor News Network, and Media Alliance have both empowered voices from impoverished San Francisco Bay Area communities and also enabled the development of "counter-public spheres" that work in tangent with mainstream media outlets.

Former state assemblyman Mike Gatto, in a 2018 opinion piece, proposed that a new form of detention be created as a method to force mentally ill homeless people and those with a substance use problem (who make up two-thirds of California's homeless population) off the streets and into treatment.

=== California (overview) ===
==== California Housing Partnership Corporation (CHPC) ====
Ongoing efforts include the California Housing Partnership Corporation (CHPC). Established in 1988 as a private nonprofit organization, it aims to sustain access to affordable housing through project partnerships with other non-profits and government housing agencies, in addition to being a resource for affordable housing policy efforts. CHPC has been successful in preserving more than 60,000 homes through over $12 billion in private and public partnerships.

==== We Count California! ====
"We Count California!" is a collaborative effort between the California Homeless Youth Project and the University of California, Berkeley School of Public Health to combat the issue of homeless youth being undercounted during the annual point-in-time homeless counts which are crucial for federal funding of homeless support programs. They hope to achieve more accurate counts by providing training and statewide technical assistance activities to support California communities toward improved youth inclusion.

==== Legislative efforts ====
In 2014, the City of San Francisco spent $167 million annually on housing homeless residents. By 2016, total spending (including housing and treatment) was believed to be $241 million annually. However, much of this spending is focused on housing the formerly homeless, or those at risk, and not the currently homeless. The city's shelter program has approximately 1,200 beds, and several hundred people are on a waitlist to be housed. Even with 1,200 shelter beds and several hundred on the waiting list, most homeless avoid the shelter for various reasons such as: overcrowding, safety, and rules that, among other things, separate people experiencing homelessness from their possessions, pets, and loved ones. In 2015, the Navigation Center shelter was created to address these issues.

There have been increasing efforts to keep homeless people away from the public eye, through forced removal, or harassment sweeps. These efforts have come to be known as the "war on the homeless". The Homeless Coalition has been an active body in the fight for homeless rights and decriminalization of homeless people. The "Right to Rest Act of the Homeless Bill of Rights Campaign" has been a large effort to allow homeless people to sit, rest, and sleep on sidewalks and in public. This effort is seen as essential especially when there is a significant shortage in affordable housing. San Francisco's policies towards homeless people have been criticized by homeless rights advocates and was listed as the eleventh least desirable city in the US to be homeless. There are 23 city infractions that are known as "quality of life" crimes because they criminalize actions that would be legal on private property, thereby disproportionately affecting homeless people. Examples include the prohibition of sleeping in public, overnight parking restrictions, and anti-loitering ordinances. The city enforces these laws by issuing an average of over 3,000 citations a year. The price of enforcing quality of life crimes for San Francisco was $20.6 million in 2015. These citations typically involve fines that can be difficult for impoverished homeless residents to pay, leading to only 7% of fines paid in 2000. Unpaid fines can often result in arrests and criminal records, which makes it more difficult to gain employment and encourages avoidance of future contact with social services due to fear of punishment. Quality of life crimes have become so prevalent that the San Francisco Police Department launched Operation Outreach to specialize in homeless related crime. The program's intended purpose is to collaborate with other city agencies like the Department of Public Health and the Department of Public Works connect members of the homeless community with social services and resources.

A pilot program was launched at Buena Vista Horace Mann K-8 Community School in November 2018 to house that school's homeless families, paying $40,000 to the nonprofit Dolores Street Community Services to manage the shelter. However, the shelter, which had the capacity to house 20 families or 50 people, averaged less than two families per night. The San Francisco Board of Education unanimously voted to expand the program in March 2019 to include eligibility across the school district.

===== California SB 1045 =====
In September 2018, California SB 1045 was signed into law by Gov. Jerry Brown. This bill will take effect on January 1, 2019, and will initiate a five-year pilot program ending on January 1, 2024. The goal of this legislation, as authored by State Senator Scott Wiener, is to improve the health of people suffering from substance abuse disorders or severe mental illness and has the potential to directly impact the homeless population of San Francisco. Under a pilot program of SB 1045, the bill would permit the board of supervisors of the County of Los Angeles, the County of San Diego and the City and County of San Francisco to appoint a conservator for an individual who is incapable of caring or making decisions for themselves through the order of a probate court. These provinces are also required to provide the following services and resources, which include, but are not limited to: adequate community housing, outpatient mental health counseling, psychiatric assistance, access to medications, and substance use disorder services. People who have had eight or more 5150 holds within a year would be considered for conservatorship. San Francisco Mayor London Breed announced that she plans to add 70 to 90 new beds for these prospective patients at the city's navigation centers and Zuckerberg San Francisco General Hospital before November 2019.

With the support of Senator Weiner and Mayor Breed, San Francisco Supervisor Rafael Mandelman introduced a bill in October 2018 that outlined the conservatorship criteria for the city. The bill mimics Wiener's legislation as it identifies those who are homeless and frequently utilize emergency services due to severe mental illness or substance use disorder as likely candidates for intervention. It is estimated that SB 1045 along with local legislation would impact between 50 and 100 people in San Francisco. Local homeless organizations and health centers have prompted concerns over criminalizing homelessness and the mentally ill as the legislation only targets those without homes. Other oppositions have noted that the bill is too narrow and only covers a small subset of the population that suffers from substance use or mental disorders.

===== Proposition C =====
Proposition C would collect up to $300 million annually to fund services for the city's homeless through taxes on San Francisco's biggest businesses. In November 2018, Proposition C was approved by 61% of San Francisco's voters; however, this proposition has been put on hold while the state debates whether a simple majority is enough to pass the proposition or whether a two-thirds supermajority should be required.

==== Navigation center ====
The Navigation Center started as a pilot intervention program and is a collaboration between the City of San Francisco and the San Francisco Interfaith Council. It is funded by a $3 million anonymous donation and is based on the belief that people experiencing homelessness would be more receptive to utilizing shelters if they were "allowed to stay with their possessions, partners, and pets." The first Navigation Center opened in 2015 at a former school building in the Mission District. Unlike other shelters, the Navigation Center allows clients to come and go as they please and tries to get them permanent housing within ten days. Navigation Center provides otherwise unsheltered residents of San Francisco with room and board while case managers work to connect them to income, public benefits, health services, shelter, and housing. Navigation Center is different from traditional housing units in that it has few barriers to entry and intensive case management.

There are 4 Navigation Centers so far in San Francisco. As of January 2017, they have provided shelter for 1,150 highly vulnerable people, and 72% of these guests have exited to housing. The Department of Homelessness and Supportive Housing determines access to Navigation Centers on a case-by-case basis. The most important goal of Navigation Centers, according to the stakeholders, is to have its guests rapid exits to housing. Due to the success of this program, The Board of Supervisors have voted for The city to negotiate a lease with Caltrans to open two Navigation Centers on state property.

In March 2019 San Francisco mayor, London Breed, proposed a navigation center to be built in San Francisco's Embarcadero. Breed's proposal was supported by tech giants Marc Benioff, Jack Dorsey, while local residents opposed to the idea which engulfed them into a 2 month long heated debate. Both pro and opposition groups started GoFundMe campaigns, SAFE Embarcadero for ALL (opp) and SAFER Embarcadero for ALL (pro), to serve their purpose; both raised more than $275,000 combined. The San Francisco Port Commission approved the 200 bed Navigation center proposed by Breed making it the largest in the city.

==== Social innovation ====
There has been an increasing need for solutions to social issues such as homelessness since the 1990s, these solutions are not anymore solely based in government reliance or the economic market, but rather through volunteerism and charity. Unfortunately, there are many limiting factors to these efforts. Social innovation clusters, or SI clusters as they are called have emerged as an alternative framework for creating solutions through social innovation. SI clusters are a result of socially oriented organizations working in close proximity with like-minded companies, which have developed more ideas for social entrepreneurship and venture philanthropy. While these ideas have developed well, social issues like homelessness in the Bay Area are still prevalent.

===== Housing homeless during COVID-19 =====
Since the beginning of March 2020, at the emergence of the COVID-19 pandemic, many non-state actors participated in the housing effort to move unhoused individuals into safe and sanitized shelter-in-place rooms.

COVID-19 Alternative Shelter Program provided temporary shelter for people experiencing homelessness. The City used a variety of facilities, including hotels, trailers, congregate sites, and Safe Sleep tent sites.

==== Sanctioned encampments ====
In March 2021, the city has been housing some homeless persons in tent cities, named "safe sleeping villages," and also providing them with food, bathrooms, and 24-hour security for a cost of more than $5,000 per tent per month (2.5 times the rent of a median one-bedroom apartment).

=== Richmond ===
==== Legislative efforts ====
In 2017, the Richmond City Council voted unanimously to establish a Richmond City homeless task force. This task force attempts to address the rising homeless crisis in Richmond and develop methods to disrupt the cycle of homelessness. As of now, there is a list of common themes that the task force wants to work towards addressing, including: Need for more accurate data, community education and engagement, more emergency housing services, long-term housing solutions, mental and behavioral health, and self-sufficiency pathways. The City of Richmond has legislation in place to allow the homeless to sleep in public without worry of citation when shelters are overcrowded. Additionally, the City of Richmond has also engaged UC Berkeley students involved in the THIMBY (Tiny House In My Backyard) project with a pilot program for developing a model for six transitional tiny homes to be placed in Richmond. This is in-line with developing efforts in the SF Bay Area to use micro-apartments and tiny houses—the Tiny House Movement—in combating the housing crisis.

=== Alameda County ===
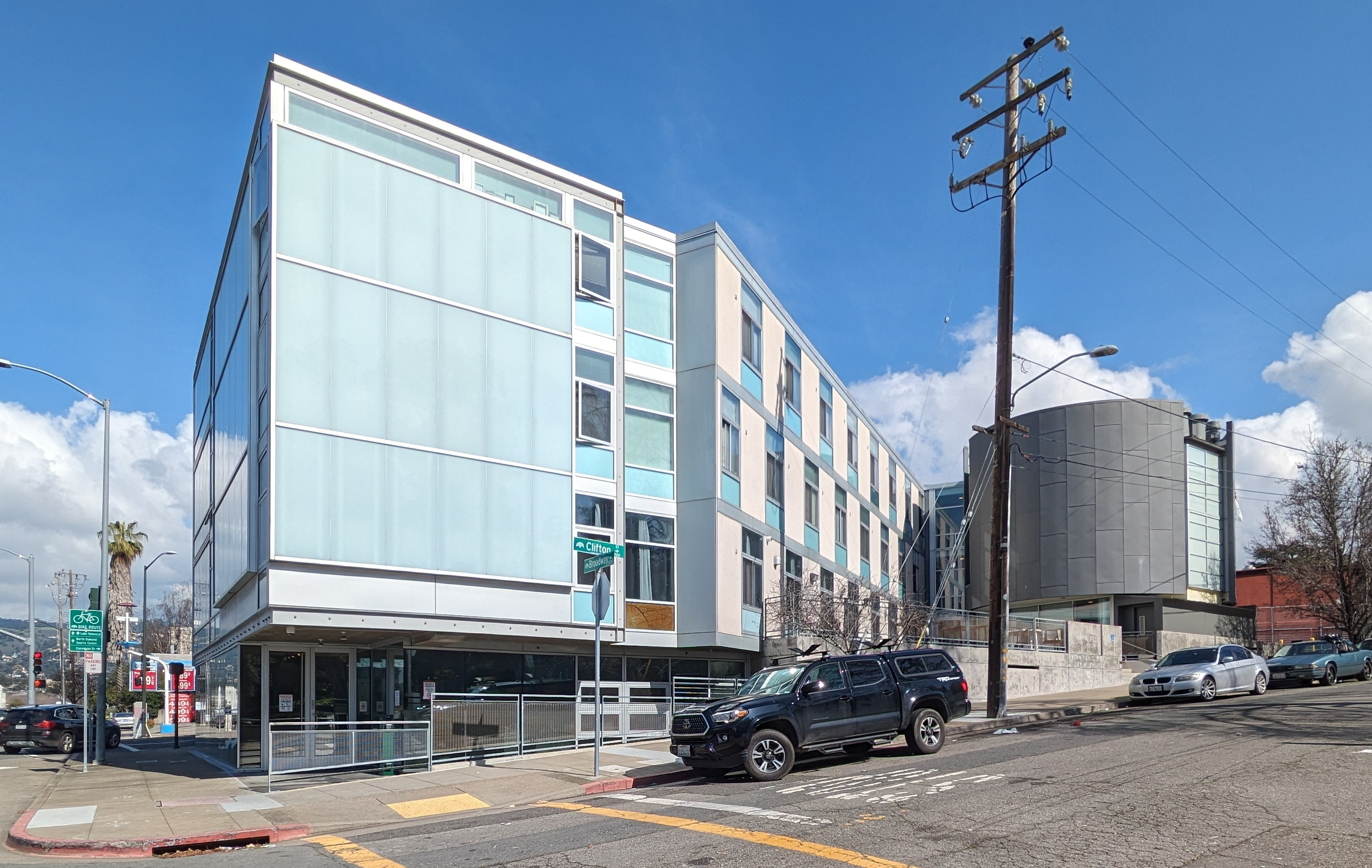
Clifton Hall, a former dormitory at California College of the Arts, was bought by the city of Oakland and converted to public housing for people experiencing homelessness.

Alameda County is currently investing $83.2 million annually into a range of services oriented toward people experiencing homelessness. These services include providing housing and shelter ($46.7 million), health and other related supported services ($14.2 million), creating a coordinated entry system ($13.2 million), preventing homelessness ($5.7 million) and outreach services to individuals and families ($4.3 million). In addition to this budget, Alameda County's 2018-2021 plan includes an additional $90.2 million one-time fund to be utilized over the course of three years. Within the 2018-2021 plan, the County Homelessness Council outlined plans to more effectively implement their budget, including servicing neglected areas of the county such as the eastern side of Livermore and some parts of Hayward and San Leandro, increasing coordination across cities, and utilizing new county housing initiatives.

==== Coordinated Entry System ====
Alameda County utilizes the coordinated entry system (CES) which can be reached by calling the number 211. This system creates a countywide database that helps to document and allocate housing according to need and in the most efficient manner. Having a countywide system allows for more coordination between the services available, service providers, and individuals who need housing. Individuals currently experiencing homelessness to be assessed based on their current living situation in order to gain immediate access to housing and related resources. Calling 211 does not guarantee that an individual will be gain access to housing, but individuals who call and give their name and contact information and disclose what their current sleeping arrangement is (on the street, in a tent, in their car, or at a friend's place, etc.) are placed on a list in order to be given housing based on their determined priority when it becomes available. In addition to connecting individuals with available housing, Alameda County 211 also offers a variety of resources including but not limited to employment assistance, legal assistance, physical health resources, substance abuse support, and child and youth services. The Alameda County 211 website also has information with resources related to transportation services and resources that are specifically for justice-involved individuals.

== Cross region attempts to address the issue ==
=== Tiny homes ===
Tiny homes have been gaining popularity as a temporary solution for homelessness across the West coast. Homeless individuals or families are commonly allowed to live in tiny homes for six months while they try to find permanent housing, often with help from caseworkers; if they cannot, they are evicted and then the tiny home is given to the next person or family on the waiting list. An analysis of data from several tiny home communities in Santa Clara and Alameda counties found that compared to dorm-style homeless shelters, which led to permanent housing less than 15% of the time, tiny home communities led to permanent housing almost 50% of the time. Dorm-style homeless shelters cost about $17,000 per bed per year; some tiny home communities like Oakland's Oak Street cost $22,500 per bed per year (with onsite portable toilets) while others with en suite bathrooms like some in San Jose cost $34,000 per bed per year. As a comparison, while the median studio apartment in San Jose rents for $29,000 per year, the tiny houses come with support services to help homeless persons get jobs and permanent housing.

== Anti-homeless ordinances ==
=== San Francisco ===
San Francisco's sit-lie law, Section 168 of San Francisco's Police Code, aims to criminalize homelessness by making it "unlawful to sit or lie down upon a public sidewalk" "during the hours seven (7:00) a.m. and eleven (11:00) p.m." Without many places to go during the day, homeless people are often subjected to law enforcement and sometimes even receiving multiple violations in the same day. Violations result in a fine between $50 and $100 or must be petitioned in court which presents even larger barriers to homeless people.

=== Berkeley ===
On December 1, 2015, an ordinance was passed that "prohibits people lying in planter beds, tying possessions to poles or trees or keeping them within two feet of a tree-well or planter, taking up more than two square feet of space with belongings, and keeping a shopping cart in one place for more than an hour during the day. It also further penalizes public urination and defecation", already illegal. On November 26, 2018, the Berkeley City Council passed a regulation that "limits the storage of personal items on city sidewalks to a 9-square-foot footprint" and prevents the placement of items that block the path of travel on sidewalks. The ordinance allows enforcement and removal of personal belongings provided written notice is given to the owner. With the start of the COVID-19 pandemic, this regulation was not enforced due to shelter-in-place orders and public health concerns. Beginning on June 15, 2021, local officials began enforcing the sidewalk ordinance, leading to the sweeping of four of the largest encampments in Berkeley.

These practices have criminalized the daily living activities of unhoused individuals on the street and contributed to the belief that being unhoused is an individual's problem rather than a societal issue; they have exacerbated hostilities between the unhoused and other residents. Anti-homeless ordinances set a precedent for targeted negative sentiments towards unhoused individuals and create division between the unhoused and other residents of the community.

=== Displacement efforts ===
Encampments, known to some as "tent cities," continue to pop up throughout the Bay Area as hotspots for those who are unhoused. These encampments have served as a place of refuge and gathering. The need for areas that are both open and accessible are key to meeting the needs of those who are unhoused. Many people experiencing homelessness opt out of taking aid from shelters due to the rigorous rules and requirements that limit accessibility and personal safety in the spaces. Due to a lack of physical and psychological safety, clients often report high levels of victimization and trauma as a result of staying in these shelters. Given that many of these encampments are established in public areas, it is often up to the discretion of the city and state governments to allow the encampments to remain where they are.

==== Seabreeze ====
The Seabreeze encampment, located under and level to the I-80 underpass in West Berkeley served as one of the largest and most populated encampments in the area. The encampment existed for well over two years before it was swept by Caltrans and Governor Gavin Newsom on August 9, 2021. The eviction came at a time in which many residents were looking for housing. Residents were given 10 minutes to gather their belonging and clear the area. This came months after an established relationship between Caltrans and the encampment, in which Caltrans has regularly hauled away debris collecting at the encampment. Alongside the sweep, Alameda County, in conjunction with Project Roomkey, aimed to offer hotel room vouchers to dozen of those who had been evicted. For months after the Caltrans sweep, the area remained fenced off to prevent further gathering.

==== People's Park ====
People's Park, established in 1969 by found Michael Delacour, began as a space for radical political activism. The park quickly grew as an encampment space for the homeless population of Berkeley. With the onset of the COVID-19 pandemic, People's Park served as the largest encampment in Berkeley, housing over 50 people. The Park serves as a space of mutual aid, in which community organizations visit the Park regularly, bringing in many of the high-need basic needs requested by the residents of the Park. Organizations like Defend People's Park and the People's Park Committee, who continue to push for no displacement, question the university's ability to house all the current residents of the Park.

== See also ==
- Plan Bay Area
- California housing shortage
- Homelessness in California

General:

- Homelessness in the United States
