= Skid row =

Impoverished urban area in North America

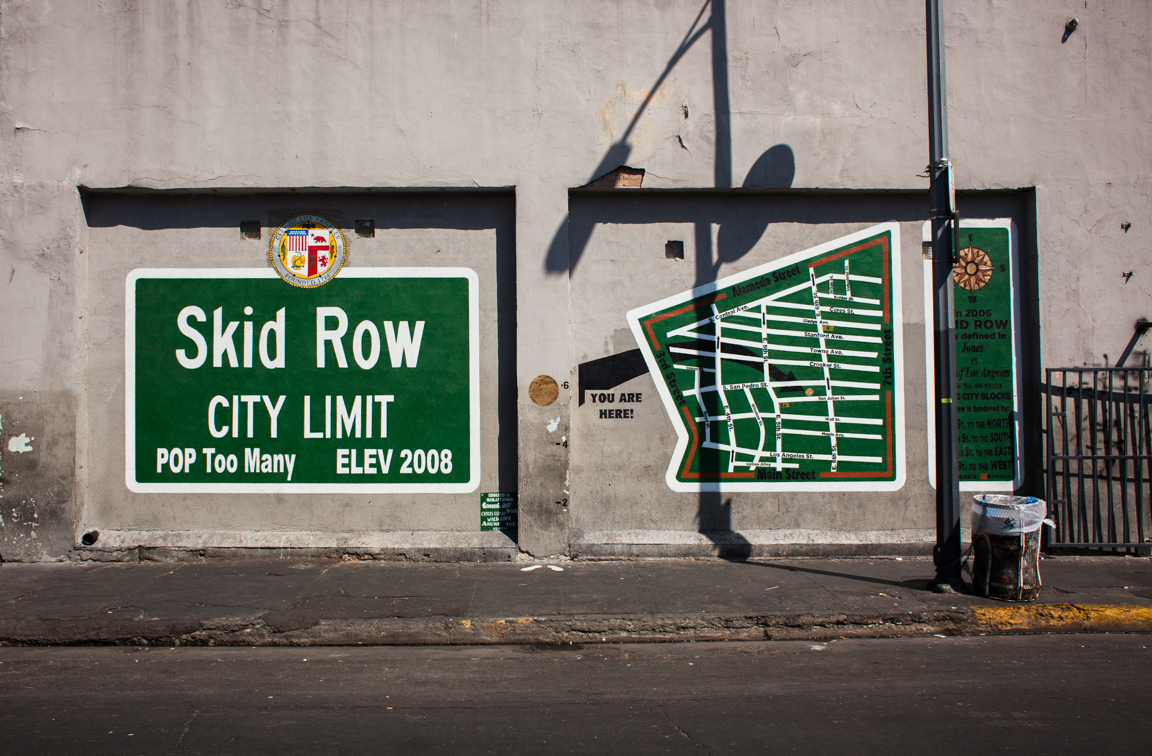
A mural of Skid Row, Los Angeles

A skid row, also called skid road, is an impoverished area, typically urban, in English-speaking North America whose inhabitants are mostly poor people "on the skids". This specifically refers to people who are poor or homeless, considered disreputable, downtrodden or forgotten by society. A skid row may be anything from an impoverished urban district to a red-light district to a gathering area for people experiencing homelessness or drug addiction. In general, skid row areas are inhabited or frequented by impoverished individuals and also people who are addicted to drugs. Urban areas considered skid rows are marked by high vagrancy, dilapidated buildings, and drug dens, as well as other features of urban blight. Used figuratively, the phrase may indicate the state of a poor person's life.

The term skid road originally referred to the path along which timber workers skidded logs. Its current sense appears to have originated in the Pacific Northwest. Areas in the United States and Canada identified by this nickname include Pioneer Square in Seattle; Old Town Chinatown in Portland, Oregon; Downtown Eastside in Vancouver; Skid Row in Los Angeles; the Tenderloin District of San Francisco; and the Bowery of Lower Manhattan. The term Poverty Flats is used for some Western US towns.

The term "skid row" may often be interchangeable with the term tent city. A tent city may exist on the premises of a skid row, but many tent cities are in areas not known as skid rows.

== Origins ==
The term "skid road" dates back to the 17th century, when it referred to a log road, used to skid or drag logs through woods and bog. The term was in common usage in the mid-19th century and came to refer not just to the corduroy roads themselves, but to logging camps and mills all along the Pacific Coast. When a logger was fired he was "sent down the skid road".

The term "skid road" is generally believed to have originated as a reference to Seattle's Yesler Way.

== United States ==
=== Albuquerque ===
International District, Albuquerque, New Mexico, specifically with some areas off Central Ave, especially intersecting Louisiana, Texas, and Rhode Island Streets, have high homelessness rates, as well as a higher than average rate of public drug usage and high property-related crime and violence. The area is colloquially known as the "War Zone". Albuquerque had a rising murder rate in the early 2020s, with the murder rate surpassing 20 per 100,000 people, as well as a surge of visible homelessness especially in the ID area. In the 1990s, some years the neighborhood would account for over half the city's homicide count, despite being 1-2% of the city's population.

=== Anchorage ===
Fourth Avenue in Downtown Anchorage has a homelessness and drug abuse problem. In 1978, a descriptive analysis document compiled by a Department of Health facility in Anchorage, regarding downtown Anchorage's social issues and vagrancy described parts of Fourth Avenue as "Skid Row". Today, the name is not commonly used professionally, but the area still has issues of homelessness, especially affecting Native Americans and Native Alaskans. Forty-five percent of Anchorage's homeless population is Alaskan Native, as compared to less than 15% of Anchorage's population being of Alaskan descent. 1,100 Anchorage residents were homeless in 2019, over two percent of the city's population. However, this figure may include those people periodically homeless at some point that year, as opposed to average counts where homeless people are counted on a given day, which usually increases the percentage. Problems of homelessness and poverty are now less concentrated in the Fourth Avenue area; homeless people are often seen in Midtown and Spenard, among other locations.

=== Austin ===
Sixth Street in Downtown Austin has issues with homeless individuals camping (which led to a proposition passing to ban public camping in most city areas) and public crime and drug use.

=== Baltimore ===
Baltimore, Maryland has a homelessness issue in the Inner Harbor. Some housing projects and gang-plagued neighborhoods bear social issues similar to skid rows.

=== Boston ===
Mass and Cass, also known as Methadone Mile or Recovery Road, is an impoverished area/tent city located at and around the intersection of Melnea Cass Boulevard and Massachusetts Avenue in Boston, Massachusetts. It has been characterized as "the epicenter of the region's opioid addiction crisis".

Due to its concentration of service providers, the area around Mass and Cass has attracted a large number of people dealing with homelessness and drug addiction, especially after the closure of the treatment facility on Long Island. 300 homeless residents were counted in the area in a November 2021 article.

The effects on local residents and the city's attempts to deal with the problem have generated considerable controversy. The city of Quincy has opposed reconstruction of the bridge to Long Island as the only access to the island by bridge is through that city. Housing and homeless advocates also protested Acting Mayor Kim Janey's October 19, 2021 announcement that Boston would begin clearing out the tent city. Janey cited the lack of hygienic facilities in tents, the sexual assaults and crime in the area, and the four or five overdoses that are reversed each day in the area. Opponents say that the dismantling of the tents and other makeshift structures, forcibly if necessary, is a criminalization of homelessness and addiction.

=== Chicago ===
Traditional Skid Row areas in Chicago were centered along West Madison Street just west of the Chicago River and, to a lesser degree, North Clark Street just north of the Chicago River. Since the 1980s both of these areas have been gentrified.

=== Denver ===
Union Station, Denver, Colorado has a homelessness and vagrancy problem. Reports of public drug consumption, including that of opiates and meth, are daily or regularly reported on the public train and buses, and the district is amongst the top 3 areas of highest violent crime. In July 2020, an estimated 1,350 people were camped out within Denver city limits, and an advocacy group for homeless individuals counted 664 tents. Lincoln Park has a high concentration of tent-dwelling homeless individuals, and reports of criminal activity and drug abuse are commonplace. Although, some tent cities are well kept in the area.

=== Honolulu ===
Chinatown has had issues with blight of homelessness and poverty. Initially more predominately Chinese when it was established and active in the 19th and early-to-mid 20th centuries, it became a red-light district after World War II era. Today, the neighborhood still experiences problems with people dealing with addiction and mental health problems, as well as homelessness and public crime.

=== Houston ===
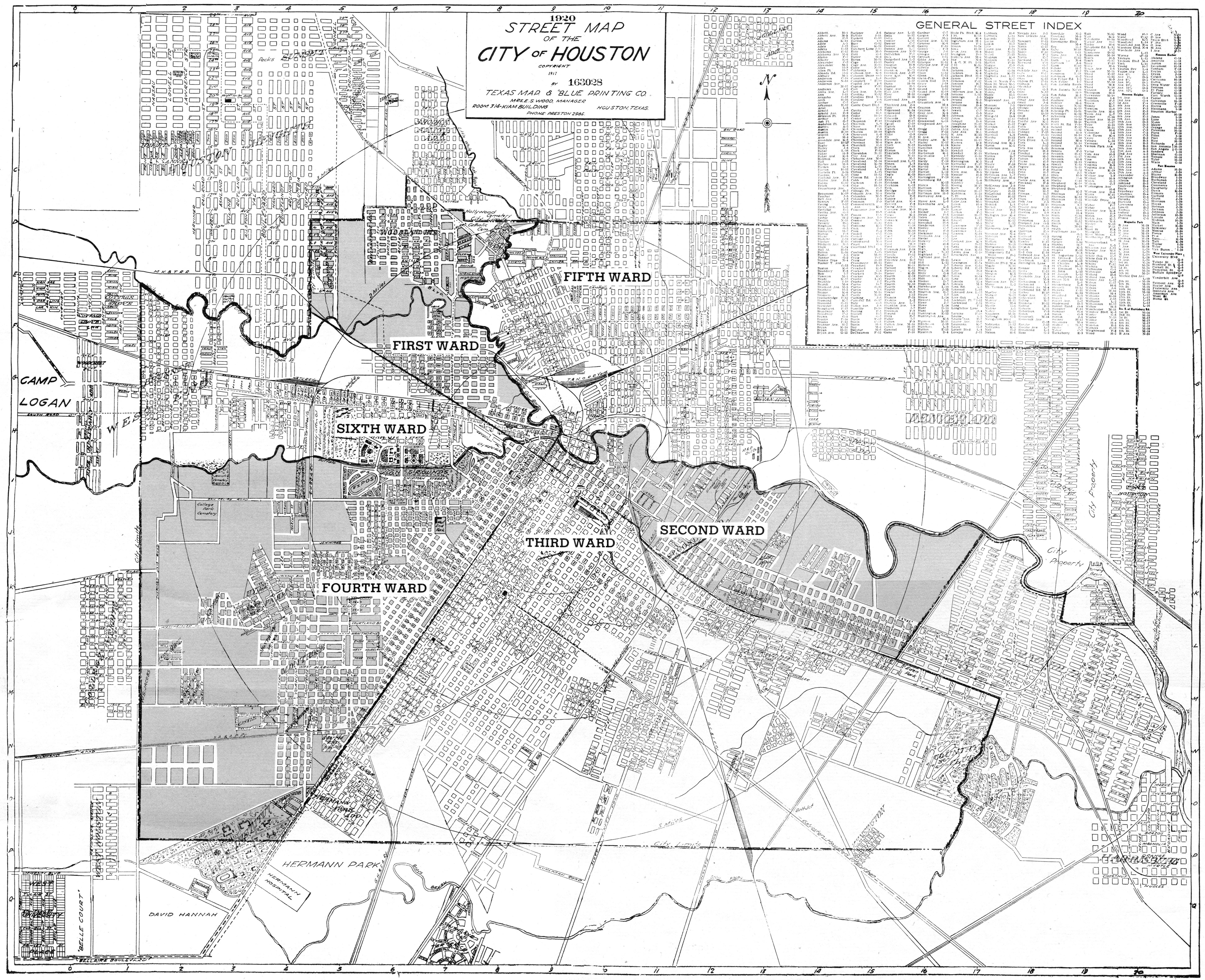
1920 map of the six wards of Houston

In the 1800s much of what was the Third Ward, the present day south side of Downtown Houston. According to some, the eastern boundary is a low rent group of houses near Texas Southern University referred to as "Sugar Hill". and among musicians, the Third Ward's boundaries are usually thought of as extending southward from the junction of Interstate 45 (Gulf Freeway) and Interstate 69/U.S. Route 59 (Southwest Freeway) to the Brays Bayou, with Main Street forming the western boundary. The Third Ward was what Stephen Fox, an architectural historian who lectured at Rice University, referred to as "the elite neighborhood of late 19th-century Houston". Ralph Bivins of the Houston Chronicle said that Fox said that area was "a silk-stocking neighborhood of Victorian-era homes". Bivins said that the construction of Union Station, which occurred around 1910, caused the "residential character" of the area to "deteriorate". Hotels opened in the area to service travelers. Afterwards, according to Bivins, the area "began a long downward slide toward the skid row of the 1990s" and the hotels were changed into flophouses. Passenger trains stopped going to Union Station. The City of Houston abolished the ward system in the early 1900s, but the name "Third Ward" was continued to be used to refer to the territory that it used to cover.

The Third Ward today, and parts of Downtown Houston area, struggle with drug issues, homelessness and poverty.

=== Los Angeles ===
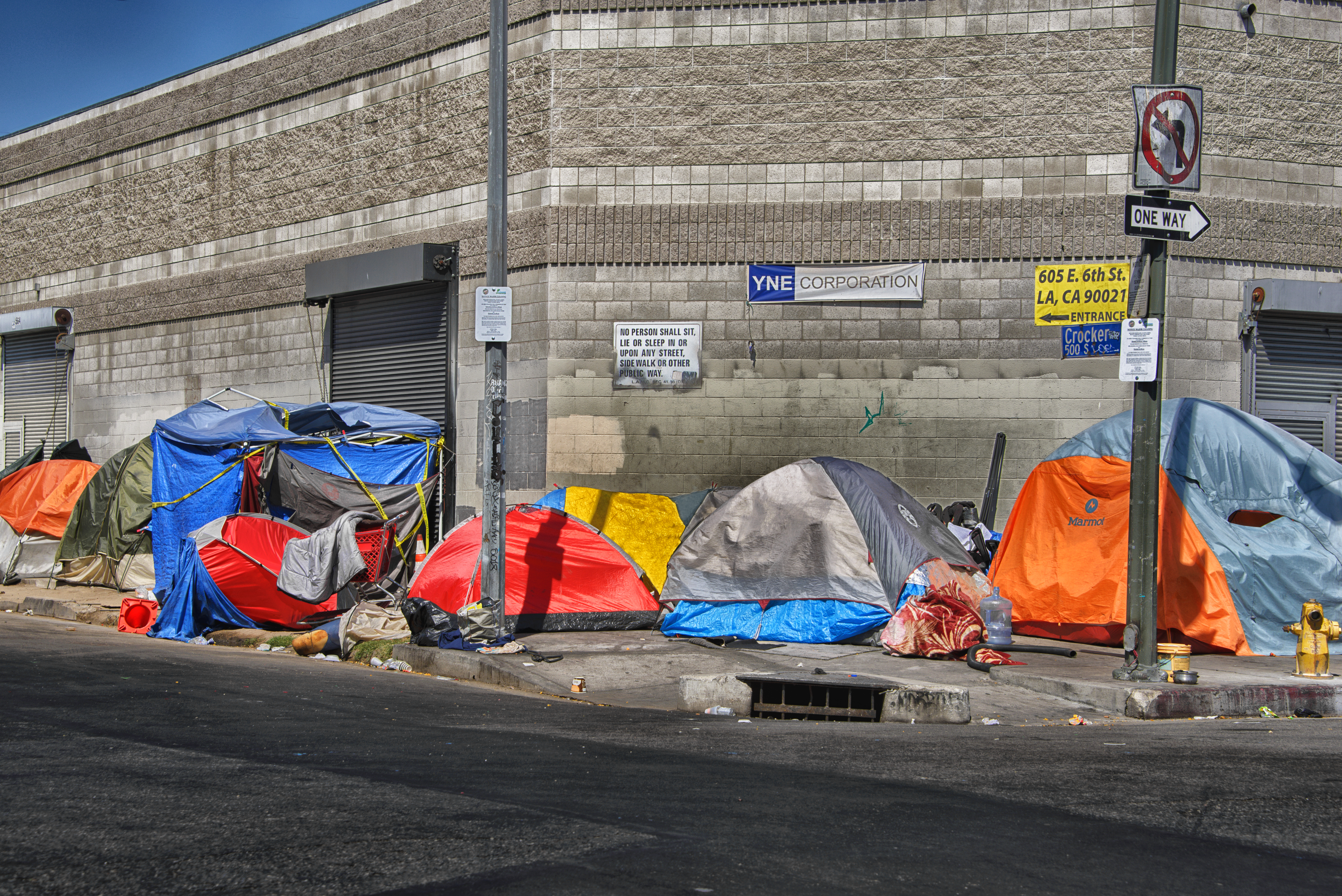
Tents of homeless people on the sidewalk in Skid Row, Los Angeles

The Los Angeles Skid Row is an area on the East side of Downtown Los Angeles, roughly bounded by Main Street on the West, Alameda Avenue on the East, 3rd Street on the North, and 7th Street on the South. The area was originally home to many cheap, low-quality hotels, popular with itinerant laborers and new arrivals to the city owing to its proximity to the train station and its central location. In an attempt to rehabilitate the area in the 1960s, most of the run-down single-room occupancy hotels were demolished. This led to major reduction in the amount of very low-cost, bare minimum housing available to the area's extremely low-income population, contributing to the severe homelessness problem in the area. Skid Row was once located at the industrial periphery of Los Angeles' often neglected downtown area. As downtown has been revitalized since the 1990s and the adjacent Arts District area has gone from a desolate industrial wasteland to a major center for tourism, entertainment, and upscale housing development, Skid Row has become increasingly hemmed in by bustling, populated neighborhoods. This has contributed to a substantial increase in the density of homeless residents living on the streets in Skid Row, since many of the new residents and businesses in the surrounding areas do not want the encampments to spread.

Local homeless count estimates have ranged from 3,668 to 8,000. In 2011, the homeless population estimate for Los Angeles' Skid Row was 4,316. L.A.'s Skid Row is sometimes called "the Nickel", referring to a section of Fifth Street.

Several of the city's homeless and social-service providers (such as Weingart Center Association, Volunteers of America, Frontline Foundation, Midnight Mission, Union Rescue Mission and Downtown Women's Center) are based in Skid Row. Between 2005 and 2007, several local hospitals and suburban law-enforcement agencies were accused by Los Angeles Police Department and other officials of transporting those homeless people in their care to Skid Row.

Within Skid Row, the Los Angeles Poverty Department (LAPD) is a performance group whose members are mostly homeless or formerly homeless people who create performances and multimedia art that highlight connections between their lived experiences and external forces that impact their lives.

Westlake and Venice Beach have had issues with street crime and homelessness, and elements of skid rows and red-light districts. As per a 2020 count, there were nearly 2,000 homeless people in Venice of its 41,000 residents in general. up from 175 in 2014. Many of them lived on Venice Beach on the sand by the shoreline, until a city-ordered sweep done in August 2021. Many people experiencing homelessness still reside in inland Venice, more towards Abbott Kinney Road.

=== Minneapolis ===
The twenty-five-block area that became known as the Gateway District in downtown Minneapolis was once the city's Skid Row. The area was a dense collection of bars, liquor stores, flop houses and rescue missions. Many on Skid Row were seasonal laborers who came from different parts of the country to work on farms or in lumber mills. During off-season months they crowded into the city, and onto Skid Row.

A documentary filmed in the late 1950s and early 1960s by John Bacich focuses on this Skid Row.

=== New York City ===
In New York City, Skid Row was a nickname given to the Bowery during much of the 20th century.

Along East 125th Street in East Harlem, Manhattan, there is a noticeable density of homelessness and drug use. There are elements of a drug and poverty-related society along with homelessness in Lower Manhattan.

New York City's climate is colder during the autumn and winter, thus more people experiencing homelessness are sheltered (less than 10% of people experiencing homelessness in the city are unsheltered), and elements of blight are usually less visible than that of west coast cities. As of 2019, 5% of NYC homeless people were unsheltered, compared to the San Francisco Bay Area's 67% being unsheltered.

=== Oakland area ===
There are some facets of skid row in nearby Oakland, California, especially on International Boulevard, where homelessness and prostitution has been problematic. There are scattered elements of skid row and tent cities in Downtown Oakland and East Oakland. People's Park, Berkeley has struggled with drug abuse and homelessness, with social services nearby. The area was a concentration of tents in Berkeley. Although the area is benign in comparison to major cities, it has a multi-decades-long history of homeless settlements.

=== Philadelphia ===
Philadelphia once had a highly visible skid row centered on Vine Street, just west of the approaches to the Benjamin Franklin Bridge. This area was essentially obliterated by highway construction starting in the 1970s.

Today, the area most often referred to as Philadelphia's modern-day skid row is in the Kensington neighborhood, along Kensington Avenue near the intersections of Somerset Street and Allegheny Avenue. The area is known for its high rates of open-air recreational drug use, poverty, and homelessness. A long-time camp largely hidden from public view in a gulch alongside Conrail tracks, spanning an area roughly from N 2nd Street to Kensington Avenue, was cleared in 2017. In late 2018, the city cleared a series of large homeless resident camps along Kensington Avenue, Emerald Street, Tulip Street, and Frankford Avenue. The homeless resident population in the Kensington neighborhood alone is estimated to be over 700 individuals.

=== Phoenix ===
In the 21st century,Phoenix, Arizona, developed a sprawling, high-concentration urban homeless encampment known locally as "The Zone". Spanning multiple blocks of Downtown Phoenix near the state capitol, the area became emblematic of modern southwestern skid rows, characterized by dense clusters of tents, open-air drug markets, high rates of crime, and severe sanitation issues.

Despite the city of Phoenix allocating tens of millions of dollars toward homeless solutions, the local unhoused population surged significantly during the early 2020s. Conditions within the encampment drew intense scrutiny from local business owners, residents, and policy organizations regarding public health hazards, safety concerns for vulnerable populations trapped in the area, and a lack of institutional accountability.

The severe deterioration of the district sparked major legal battles and citizen-led legislative actions. Property owners filed landmark litigation against the city of Phoenix to force the abatement of the public nuisance caused by the encampment. This culminated in broader policy pushes, including voter-approved statewide measures (such as Arizona's Proposition 312) designed to compel local governments to maintain public spaces and address chronic urban camping through mandated enforcement and access to treatment services.

=== Portland ===
Old Town Chinatown, a mostly defunct Chinatown of Portland, Oregon, has a high prevalence of hard drug use, homelessness, poverty, and property and violent-related crimes.

As of November 2021, a surge of meth was reported to be used amongst the homeless community in Greater Portland. In the 1980s and 1990s, where the meth epidemic was at a high in Portland, 35% of the drug was locally produced, as opposed to nearly zero percent of meth used by the homeless communities as reported in 2021.

Downtown Portland suffers a homelessness issue at large, as of the late 2010s and early 2020s.

=== Seattle ===
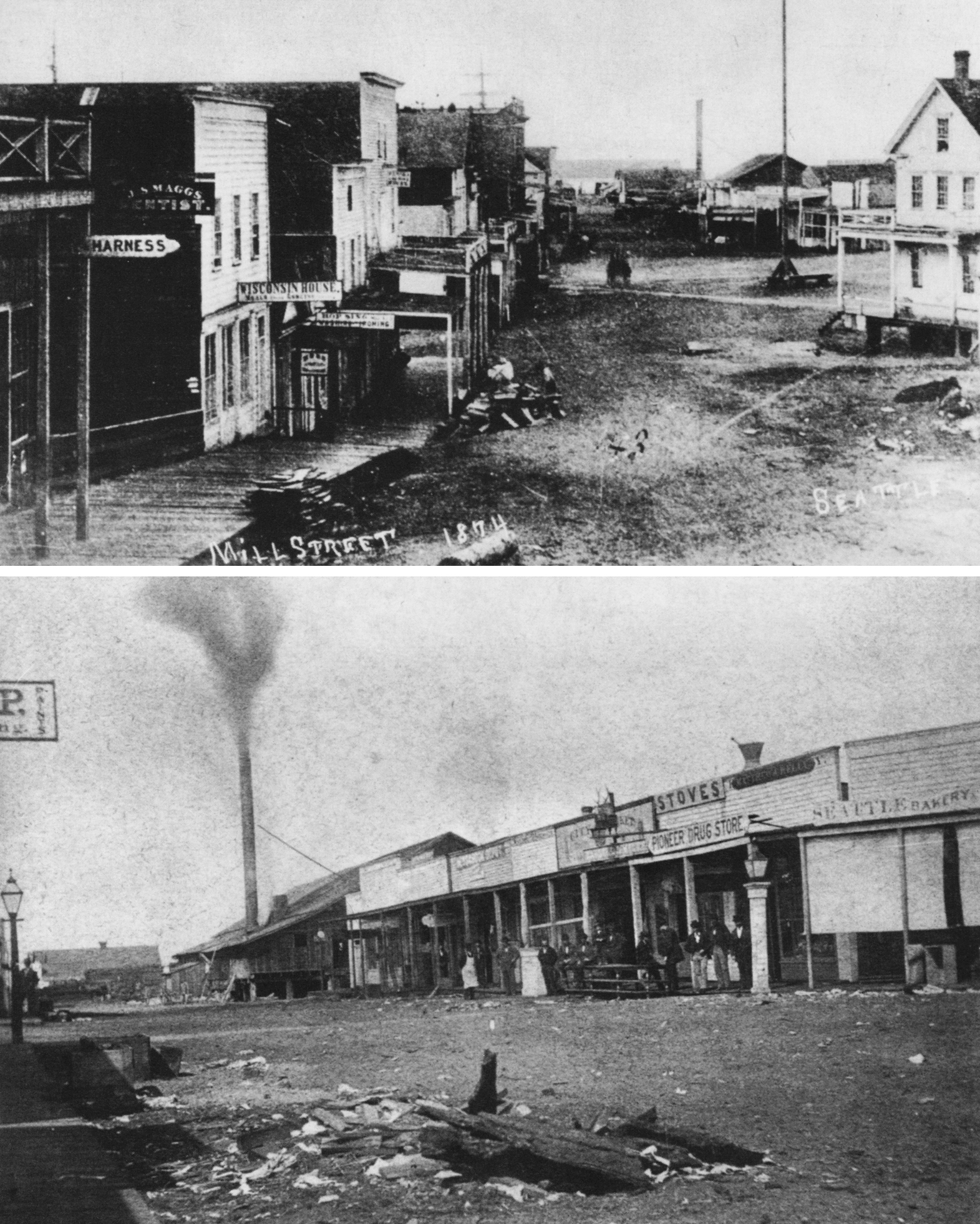
Mill Street, now Yesler Way, was the original "Skid Road" in Seattle, Washington. (Note: Top: View looking west to Yesler's Mill at the end of the street (see smokestack) and nearby cookhouse; the tall pole in the road on the right is where the Pioneer Square pergola stands today, (1874) Bottom: Yesler's Mill, stores, and taverns on Skid Road)

The name "Skid Road" was in use in Seattle by the 1850s when the city's historic Pioneer Square neighborhood began to expand from its commercial core. The district centered near the end of what is now Yesler Way, the original "Skid Road" named after the freshly‑cut logs that were skidded downhill toward Henry Yesler's mill.

Henry Yesler acquired land from Doc Maynard at a small point of land at what is today near the intersection of 1st Avenue and Yesler Way. He also acquired a swath of land 450 feet (140 m) wide, from his property up First Hill to a box of land about 10 acres (4.0 ha) in size, full of timber, spanning what is today 20th to 30th avenues. Logs would be moved down the skid road of Yesler Way to his mill. In the words of Murray Morgan, "This district south of Yesler Way, this land below the Deadline, has helped fix the word on the American language. The Skid Road: the place of dead dreams." His steam-powered logging mill was built in 1853 on the point of land that looked south towards a small island (Denny's Island, part of his land purchase from Doc Maynard) that has since been expanded with infill and is the heart of today's Pioneer Square. The mill operated seven days a week, 24 hours per day, on the waterfront.

The Skid Road became the demarcation line between the affluent members of Seattle and the mill workers and more rowdy portion of the population. The road became Mill Street, and eventually Yesler Way, but the nickname "Skid Road" was permanently associated with the district at the street's end. The street's end near the mill attracted cookhouses and inexpensive hotels for itinerant workers, along with several establishments that served beer and liquor.

=== San Diego ===
East Village, near Barrio Logan, Logan Heights, and Sherman Heights, has struggled with homelessness and drug abuse.

=== San Francisco ===
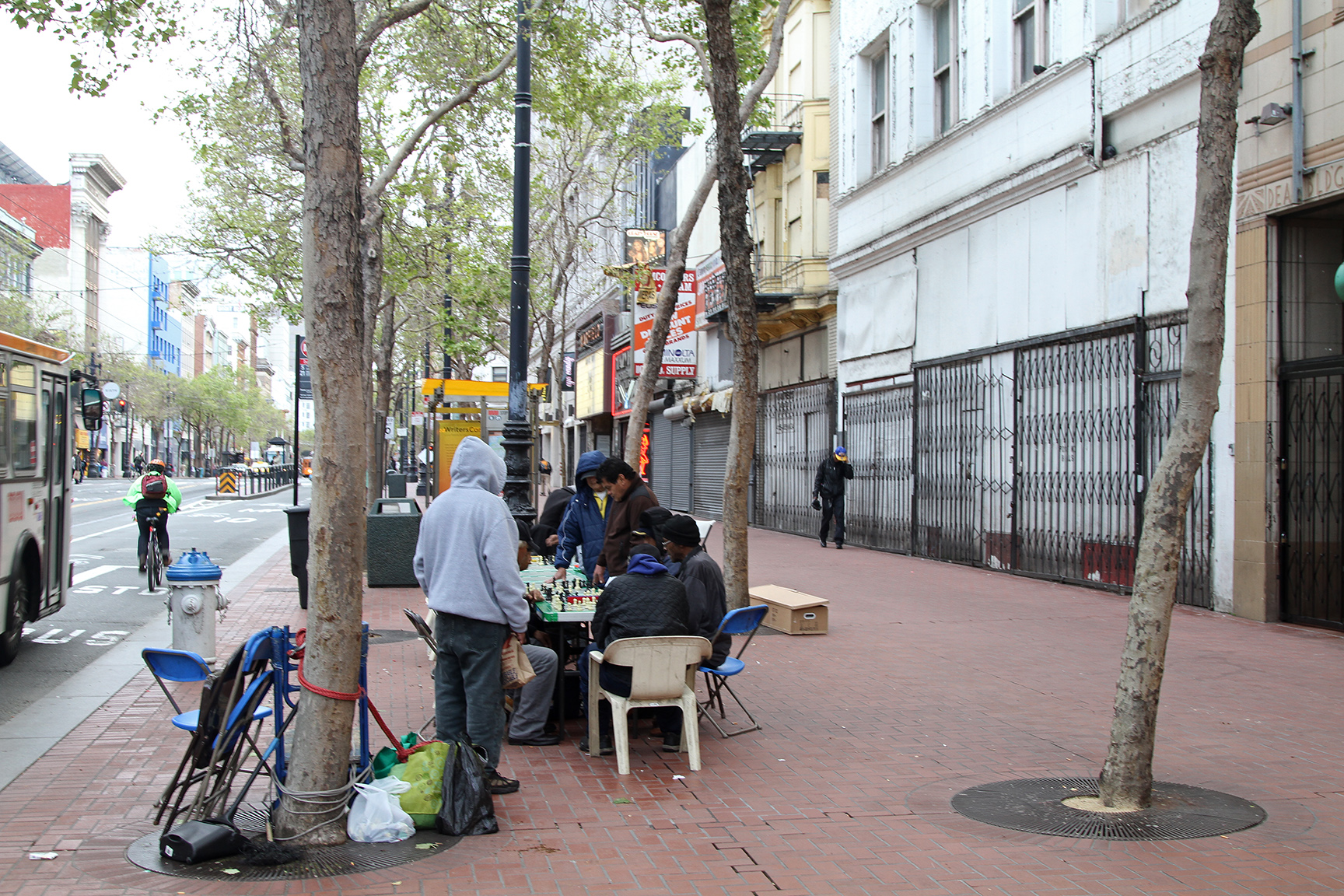
People playing chess by Market and Turk Streets.

The Tenderloin neighborhood is a small, dense neighborhood near downtown San Francisco. In addition to its history and diverse and artistic community, there is significant poverty, homelessness, and crime.

It is known for its immigrant populations, single-room occupancy hotels, ethnic restaurants, bars and clubs, alternative arts scene, large homeless resident population, public transit and close proximity to Union Square, the Financial District, and Civic Center. The 2000 census reported a population of 28,991 persons, with a population density of 44,408/mi^{2} (17,146/km^{2}), in the Tenderloin's 94102 Zip Code Tabulation Area, which also includes the nearby Hayes Valley neighborhood.

During the 1960s, when development interests and the Redevelopment Agency were using eminent domain to clear out a large area populated by retired men in the South of Market area, that area was termed "Skid Row" in the media. The city's convention center was built after the clearing of long term low-income residents. The neighborhood continues to be a plight of drug-related use and crime and homelessness of San Francisco, along with nearby South of Market, by Market and 6th and Market and 7th Streets. Tent cities were concentrated along Market Street in San Francisco, towards downtown, but are more scattered around the city as of November 2022.

16th Street and Mission to 24th Street and Mission also have a high visible prevalence of unhoused and open-air drug use and sales.

== Canada ==
=== Vancouver ===
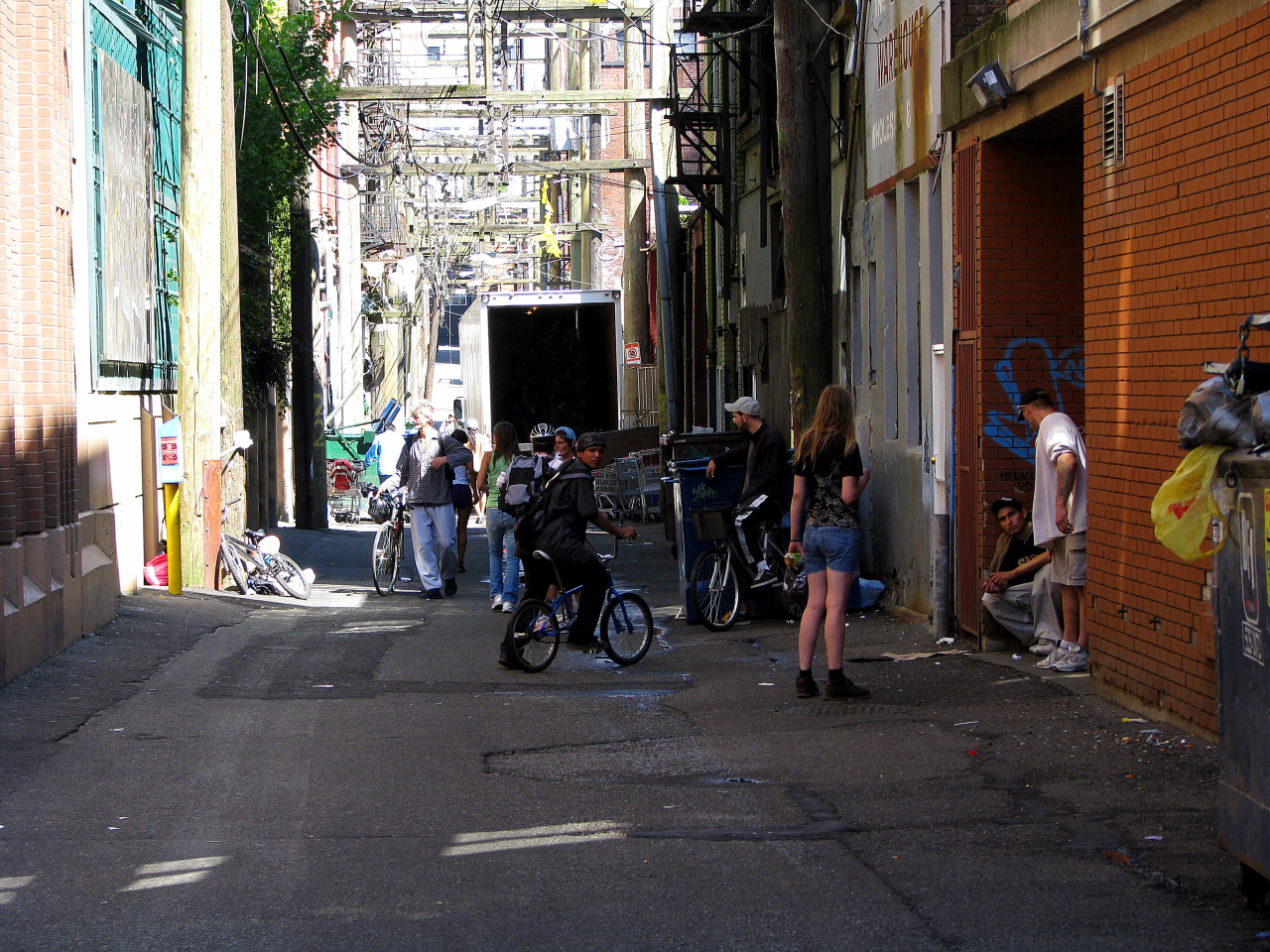
Downtown Eastside

The 100-block of East Hastings Street in Vancouver, British Columbia, the heart of that city's skid road neighborhood, lies on a historical skid road. The Vancouver Skid Road was part of a complex of such roads in the dense forests surrounding the Hastings Mill and adjacent to the settlement of Granville, Burrard Inlet (Gastown).

The city began as a sawmill settlement called Granville, in the early 1870s. By at least the 1950s, "Skid Road" was commonly used to describe the more dilapidated areas in the city's Downtown Eastside, which is focused on the original "strip" along East Hastings Street due to a concentration of single-room occupancy hotels (SROs) and associated drinking establishments in the area. The area's seedy origins date back to the early concentration of saloons in pre-Canadian prohibition (1915–1919) and its popularity with loggers, miners and fishermen whose work was seasonal and who spent their salaries in the area's cheap accommodations and public houses.

Opium and heroin use became popular early on; Vancouver was for many years the main port-of-entry for the North American opium supply. During the Great Depression, the railway rights-of-way and other vacant lots in the area were thronged by the unemployed and poor, and the pattern of social decay became well-established. In the 1970s, the endemic alcohol and poverty problems in the area were exacerbated by the expansion of the drug trade, with crack cocaine becoming high-profile in the 1980s as well as a re-concentration of the prostitution trade in the area because of the relocation of hooker strolls in conjunction with city policy for Expo 86.

A portion of Vancouver's Skid Row, Gastown, has also been gentrified; however it is in a difficult coexistence with the nearby impoverished Downtown Eastside along East Hastings Street.

The Downtown Eastside is deemed to be one of the poorest urban areas in Canada. It is wedged between popular tourist destinations such as Downtown, Chinatown and Gastown. East Hastings Street is also a major thoroughfare. These avenues of exposure make the Downtown Eastside a highly visible example of a skid row.

The Downtown Eastside (sometimes abbreviated D.T.E.S.) is also home to Insite, the first legal intravenous drug safe injection site in North America, part of a harm reduction policy aimed at helping the area's drug addicted residents. Additional sites have been established with approval from Health Canada in 2017 and 2018 as part of the strategy for dealing with the epidemic of lethal opioid (primarily fentanyl) overdoses.

=== Montreal ===
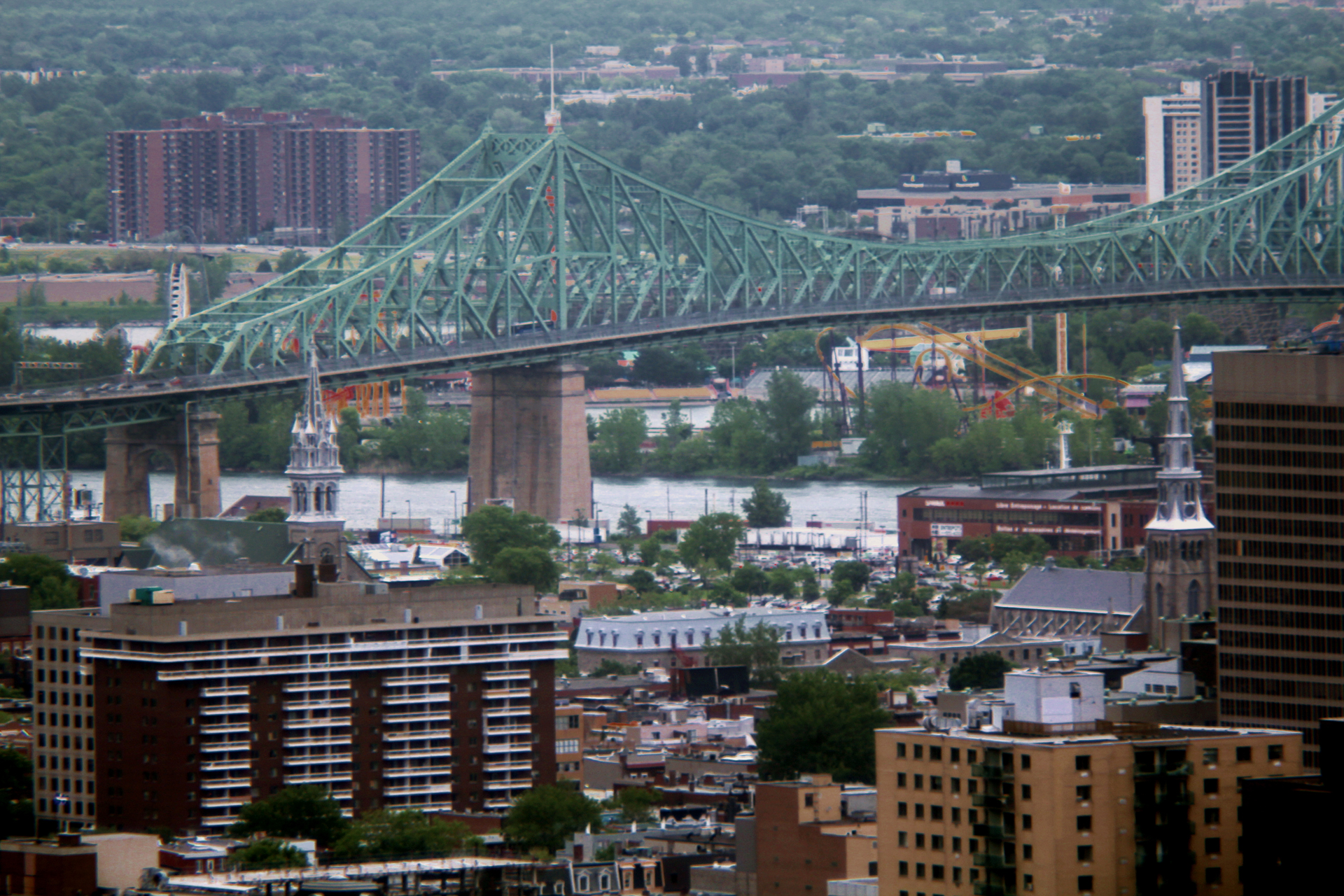
Centre-Sud of Montreal, overlooked by the Jacques Cartier Bridge

The Centre-Sud neighborhood of Montreal, located directly east of downtown, has long been notorious for prostitution (particularly on Ontario Street and Dufresne Street) as well as poverty and drug trafficking more broadly. Also, the Place Émilie-Gamelin neighborhood suffers from homelessness and blight.

Gentrification has changed this somewhat in recent years.

== Mexico ==
Puerto Vallarta, Mexico's "romantic area" by its boardwalks has issues of homelessness, vagrancy, open drug abuse, fighting, and public violence. Mexico as a country struggles with poverty and migrants to the U.S. often end up homeless or near the Mexican border awaiting arrival. Elements of skid row and shantytowns may exist along the U.S.-Mexican border with awaiting migrants. While specific "skid rows" are not thoroughly documented in articles, at least mainly in English, crystal meth is often shipped in from Ciudad Juarez and Tijuana, Baja California, both border cities. Both cities also have issues of meth consumption as well as other drugs, and homelessness and poverty are rampant in some districts.

According to a 2018 article by KPBS Public Media (KPBS), with the BBC World Service, Tijuana has 1,800 people who are described as "living on the streets". It is uncertain whether this figure includes those in homeless shelters or sleeping in vehicles. This number is less than half a percent of Tijuana's population, and far fewer than the 9,160 homeless individuals in neighboring San Diego County, California. However, the count in Tijuana does not include thousands of people who live in makeshift homes on canyons, often without running water or electricity. The academic research institute, El Colegio de la Frontera Norte, concluded in 2014 that nearly half of people experiencing homeless in Tijuana are deportees from the US, based on their surveys of a specific shelter. Violent crime in Tijuana reached unprecedented levels in 2017, with 1,780 murders in Greater Tijuana, a rate of more than 100 per 100,000 people.

== Australia ==
=== Melbourne ===
Elizabeth Street, Melbourne, Australia, has an issue involving drug abuse, homelessness, and vagrancy. The Herald Sun, in two 2016 articles about the growing issues of homelessness; drug and alcohol abuse; and public disturbances, described the street's southern end towards Flinders Street as Melbourne's 'skid row'.

In 2010, an Elizabeth Street housing project organization was founded, endeavouring to help homeless and needy people find housing and treatment for health and job-related issues. As a result, 131 studio apartments and 30 two-bedroom apartments were built.

In January 2017, reports of a camp of homeless people being moved from under Flinders Street station to an organized housing facility made the News.com.au headlines. The Victorian state government spent $10 million on this project, with the intent of providing 30 new permanent modular and relocatable homes on public land to be in place by the end of 2017.

During the early months of the COVID-19 pandemic in Australia in March-early June 2020, the Victorian government provided $15 million to homelessness organisations to find temporary accommodation in hotels for people who were sleeping on the street. On June 13, 2020, it was announced that a further $9.8 million was spent on the project to keep them there in the short term, but also help them plan a pathway into more long-term, stable accommodation. During these months, at least 4500 people had been put up in hotels across the state of Victoria, 1000 in the Melbourne central business district alone.

== In popular culture ==
Little Shop of Horrors, the Broadway musical, and Little Shop of Horrors (1986), the film, are set in Skid Row, New York, while the original black-and-white production from 1960 is set in Skid Row, Los Angeles. The musical and 1986 film both feature the song "Skid Row (Downtown)".

The American hard rock/heavy metal band Skid Row was formed in 1986. It achieved commercial success with its album of the same name.

== See also ==
- Cannery Row of Monterey, California
- Chow Kit, Kuala Lumpur, Malaysia
- Chungking Mansions, Hong Kong, has issues with public crime, drugs, and prostitution
- Deinstitutionalisation
- Homelessness
- The Jungle (San Jose), a former tent city, and Downtown San Jose has elements of skid row
- List of tent cities in the United States
- Patient dumping
- People's Park (Berkeley)
- Poverty
- Santa Rosa Avenue (adjacent to South Park) in Santa Rosa, California
- Skidder
- Slum
- Stingaree, San Diego
