= Running club =

Eclectic institution specialising in running or track and field

A running club is a running-oriented athletics club. The club may train for and compete in cross country, road running, fell running, track and field, as well as multidiscipline sports such as triathlon.

== Clubs by country ==
=== International ===
- Achilles International
- HSI

=== Australia ===
Region	Club
Brisbane	Thompson Estate and Eastern Suburbs Athletics
Melbourne	Coburg Harriers Old Melburnians Athletics Club

=== Greece ===
Region	Club
Athens	Panathinaikos Athletics

=== Portugal ===
Region	Club
Lisbon	Sporting CP

=== Turkey ===
Region	Club
Istanbul	Beşiktaş Enka SK; Fenerbahçe Athletics; Galatasaray Athletics; Üsküdar Belediyespor
İzmir	İzmir Büyükşehir Belediyesi GSK

=== United Kingdom ===
Region	Club
National	100 Marathon Club Road Runners Club (UK)
London	Enfield and Haringey Athletic Club; Herne Hill Harriers; Ranelagh Harriers; Run Dem Crew; Serpentine Running Club; Thames Hare and Hounds; Highgate Harriers; Thames Valley Harriers
Cambridge	Cambridge University Hare and Hounds
Wales	Swansea Harriers Athletics Club

=== United States ===
Region	Club
National	Road Runners Club of America
Northeast	Boston Athletic Association DC Road Runners Club; New York Road Runners; NYCRUNS; Reebok Boston Track Club
Pacific Northwest	Bowerman Track Club Nike Oregon Project; Oregon Track Club
West	Athletics West Divine Madness Running Club; Dolphin South End Runners; San Francisco Track and Field Club; Santa Monica Track Club; Skid Row Running Club; Southern California Striders
South	Atlanta Track Club West Texas Running Club

== Running crew ==
There is a distinction between a running club and crew, the latter emerged in the early 2000s, and they differ from traditional running clubs as the focus is on urban running on city streets. One of the crews widely considered to be the first is the Bridge Runners formed by Mike Saes in New York City in 2004. In 2006, Charlie Dark formed Run Dem Crew in London which has since grown to several hundred people who meet every Tuesday, and has led to Dark receiving a Points of Light award from the UK prime minister Theresa May for his dedication to establishing the alternative running community.

Running crews have since proliferated in popularity with many North American cities, such as Vancouver, becoming home to dozens.

== See also ==
- Parkrun
