= Jeff Fairbanks =

- Born: 6 January 1980 (age 46); Hialeah, Florida, United States
- Genres: Jazz, korean traditional, chinese traditional, classical
- Occupations: Composer, performer, bandleader
- Years active: 1998 –

Jeff Fairbanks (born January 6, 1980) is an American composer, band leader, and multiinstrumentalist.

== Awards ==
Music awards and honors include a fellowship from the New York Foundation for the Arts, US Air Force Sammy Nestico Award, the BMI Charlie Parker Award, ASCAP Young Jazz Composer Award, three ASCAP Plus Awards and an IMA Independent Music Awards. He received grants from the Aaron Copland Fund, American Composers Forum, four grants each from the New Music USA and Queens Council on the Arts. He has been commissioned by the West Point Band Jazz Knights, BMI/NY Jazz Orchestra, USAF Airmen of Note, Chinese Music Ensemble of New York, National Gugak Center, Nangye Gugak Orchestra, Hora Decima and more.

== Bandleader ==
Jeff's Jazz ensemble, Project Hansori, appears on his debut recording as a leader, Mulberry Street (BJURecords). Documenting his compositions fusing East Asian traditional music and Jazz, this award-winning album was released on the Brooklyn Jazz Underground label in 2011, to international critical praise. Produced by Darcy James Argue, the album includes as a guest the late Fred Ho, baritone saxophonist and pioneer in Asian-Jazz fusion. Notable ensemble members include Linda Oh, Remy Le Boeuf and Erica von Kleist.

In 2012 Jeff formed NoLaFunk band Street Beat Brass, for which he composes, arranges, and plays sousaphone. The band has toured internationally for the US State Department, opened for the New York Philharmonic, and made many TV appearances, such as on ABC's Good Morning America and Fox Sports' First Things First. It has appeared annually at large sporting events including the Kentucky Derby, the TD Five Boro Bike Tour, and the Brooklyn Half Marathon. Street Beat Brass released the album Get in the Beat (Big Sky Press) in 2018.

== East Asian Music ==
Initially trained in Western styles and trombone, Jeff's career eventually led him to study various music traditions of East Asia. He studied the piri and taepyeongso and Korean musical notation under several recognized Gugak masters. He attended several workshops by invitation including at the National Gugak Center in Seoul. He collaborated with many players of Asian instruments. Highlights in this area include being a finalist in the 2015 Singapore Chinese Orchestra international composer competition, having a piece premiered by the National Gugak Orchestra in South Korea in 2019 featuring piri soloist Gamin, and by the Chinese Music Ensemble of New York in 2018.

== Sideman ==
As a trombonist he has toured with the Glenn Miller Orchestra, done brief stints with the Tommy and Jimmy Dorsey Orchestras, and played in many others. His years in the Red Mike Festival Band, a little-known cultural staple of NYC's Little Italy and Chinatown since 1929, provided multicultural inspiration for his album Mulberry Street. Across various groups he has toured in Europe, Asia, Latin America, and throughout the U.S.

He earned Bachelor's and master's degrees from the University of South Florida. Jeff teaches at the Beacon Music Factory, and previously taught at the New York Jazz Academy and Queens Music Academy.

== Discography ==
Recordings as performer/composer/arranger

- Mulberry Street (2011)
- Get in The Beat (2018)

Recordings as sideman

- Ring Shadows (2022) - Artist: Peter Louis
