= Charles Hollis Jones =

American artist and furniture designer (1945–2026)

Charles Hollis Jones (July 18, 1945 – August 7, 2026) was an American artist and furniture designer. He is known for his use of acrylic and lucite.

== Life and career ==
Jones was born in Bloomington, Indiana, on July 18, 1945. He founded CHJ Designs in 1961, at the age of sixteen, and moved to Los Angeles, California, in 1963. At the time, acrylic and plastic were not commonly used as a material for upscale furniture and art, but Jones began creating pieces for showrooms, such as Hudson-Rissman.

His work was well received. Frank Sinatra, Lucille Ball and Johnny Carson were among some of those to commission Jones to design pieces for their homes. An aging Tennessee Williams commissioned Jones to design a writing chair: the result was the Wisteria chair.

In the 1970s, Jones crafted his Edison Lamp. Using original Thomas Edison light bulbs, Jones created a lamp with steel and lucite to show the inner workings of Edison's original technology. It won him the California Design 11 Competition and special recognition from the German government.

His work has been featured in several museums, including the Norton Simon Museum in Pasadena, California. The Los Angeles Times referred to him as a "pioneer in acrylic design." Jones lived in the Burbank area of Los Angeles and was still designing furniture and accessories. He designed awards, including the sculpture for the 2008 Golden Heart Award held at the Beverly Hills Hotel to honor Clancy Imislund for his contributions to the Midnight Mission.

Jones died on August 7, 2026, at the age of 81.
