= Clancy Imislund =

Influential figure in Alcoholics Anonymous

Clancy Imislund (July 9, 1927 – August 21, 2020) was an influential figure in the Alcoholics Anonymous (AA) community. He served as the managing director of the Midnight Mission in Los Angeles for 46 years.

Born in Eau Claire, Wisconsin, Imislund joined the Merchant Marine and the Navy during World War II, when he began struggling with alcoholism. In 1946 he enrolled at the University of Wisconsin–Eau Claire, planning a career in journalism. He married and began a family, but recurring issues with alcohol led to frequent job losses and he experienced personal difficulties including the death of his son. He ended up homeless on Skid Row, Los Angeles. Following his involvement with AA, he achieved sobriety in October 1958 and was able to eventually reunite with his family.

In 1974, Imislund returned to the Midnight Mission, where he was appointed managing director in 1976. Under his leadership, the Mission expanded its services to include substance abuse treatment, job training, and housing support. Imislund also founded the Pacific Group, a prominent AA meeting group, and was a sponsor to numerous individuals. He was a sober coach to Carrie Fisher, and helped Anthony Hopkins get sober. He was a close friend of Dick Van Dyke.

Imislund died on August 21, 2020, at the age of 93, from complications due to COVID-19 contracted during his recovery from hip surgery.
