= Luka Lesson =

Artist

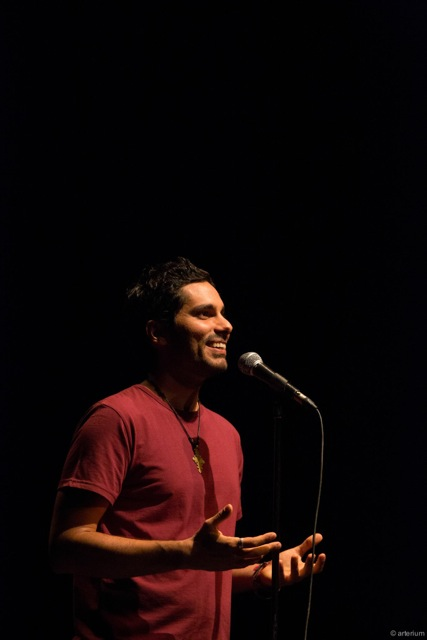
Portrait of Luka Lesson

Luka Lesson is an Australian slam poet. He won the Australian Poetry Slam in 2011 and has been described by Charlie Dark as "a young Saul Williams" in reference to his composition and delivery of poetry in providing social commentary.

== Early life ==
Lesson grew up in Brisbane. His family is Greek Australian with his paternal grandfather coming from Monolithos, Rhodes and later settled in Brisbane.

== Education ==
Lesson holds a first class honours degree in Indigenous Studies and in 2010 and 2011, taught that same topic alongside Indigenous academics at Monash University. He also holds a Master of Sound Design from the Victorian College of the Arts, University of Melbourne, supervised by Roger Alsop.

== Work ==
Lesson works actively with young people to develop their power of expression, and to utilize the form of the spoken (and written) word as a means of empowerment and a form of self-determination, creating awareness for marginalized and disempowered youth. He is particularly famous for his poem titled "Please resist me".

His first album Please Resist Me was published in February 2012. The album name, and specifically the song entitled "Please Resist Me" speaks to colonial powers, and powers that further seek to exploit, undermine and diminish people and communities and the strength that can be found in this struggle, and its contribution to change.

He has collaborated with the Queensland Symphony Orchestra, performing his concerto interrogating the life of Governor Lachlan Macquarie.

He has performed alongside other international artists such as Shane Koyczan (Canada), Amir Sulaiman (USA), Lowkey (UK) and Lemon Anderson (USA), and was invited to perform features at the famous Nuyorican Poet's Cafe in New York City in 2011 and 2012.

In April 2022, he performed in a one-man show called "Agapi and Other Kinds of Love" at the National Museum of Australia.
