= Los Angeles Community Action Network =

Grassroots organization in California

Los Angeles Community Action Network (LACAN) is a grassroots organization based in the Skid Row area of Los Angeles, California. Founded in 1999, LACAN works to organize low-income and homeless residents through advocacy, community organizing, litigation and education. The organization focuses on issues such as housing rights and the civil rights of the unhoused population.The organization is known for prioritizing the leadership of those directly affected by the issues it addresses.

== Projects and initiatives ==
=== EcoHood Project ===
Through its EcoHood project, LACAN aims to build more affordable and energy-efficient housing that is quicker to construct, addressing the increased demand for housing since the pandemic and reducing the ecological footprint.

=== Impact of Structural Racism on Women in Skid Row ===
LACAN also released a report titled “The Impact of Structural Racism on Women in Skid Row,” highlighting how structural racism affects unhoused women of color, particularly focusing on issues like family separation and child removal by the Department of Children and Family Services (DCFS), and was informed by the Downtown Women's Action Coalition (DWAC).

=== Housing advocacy ===
LACAN members, including former professionals, veterans, and long-time residents, have fought against gentrification, landlord abuses, and city policies. The organization's efforts led to a moratorium on housing conversions and a residential hotel preservation ordinance, protecting 19,000 low-income housing units from demolition or upscale conversion.

In 2017, LACAN has filed an appeal and led protests against a proposed 33-story high-rise in Downtown LA's Fashion District, arguing that the city should prioritize housing the homeless over approving luxury residential projects, especially given the high vacancy rate in existing units.

in 2023, Pete White, executive director of LACAN, criticized the expanding outreach efforts in Los Angeles as a "smoke and mirrors" strategy, dubbing it the "outreach industrial complex," suggesting it's more about appearance than real solutions to homelessness.

In 2024, LACAN organizer Adam Smith criticized Los Angeles' prioritization of criminalization over addressing homelessness, citing the failure of policies like LAMC 41.18, which resulted in belongings of unhoused residents being confiscated without adequate housing or shelter alternatives, as revealed in a recent LACAN survey of 100 individuals.

=== Safer Cities Initiative ===
In 2006, the Safer Cities Initiative, launched by Mayor Villaraigosa and Police Chief Bratton, increased police presence and targeted the homeless population with numerous citations and arrests, predominantly for minor infractions like jaywalking. This initiative resulted in significant displacement and increased arrests, leading LACAN to respond with community watch programs, demonstrations, and legal actions.

=== Dirty Divide ===
The documentary The Dirty Divide, by filmmaker Paul Freedman, highlights the severe human rights abuses and systemic neglect faced by the unhoused population in Los Angeles, particularly focusing on the efforts of the LACAN in advocating for fair housing, employment, and fighting against police brutality.

=== Food ===
LACAN operates a rooftop garden and hosts a marketplace where residents can access fresh produce, free haircuts, and community events.
