= Attica Blues =

Attica Blues may refer to:

- Attica Blues (album), by avant-garde jazz saxophonist Archie Shepp
- Attica Blues (band), from United Kingdom
