= Skid Row Running Club =

The Skid Row Running Club is a running club based in the Skid Row neighborhood of Los Angeles, California. Since its founding, the club has had more than five hundred participants.

== History ==
In 2012, the Skid Row Running Club was founded by Los Angeles Superior Court Judge Craig Mitchell at the Midnight Mission, as an effort to improve the livelihood of those in the Skid Row area. Mitchell was invited down to the Midnight Mission by Roderick Brown, a man Mitchell had previously sentenced to prison. After Brown was released from prison, he was paroled and began living at the Midnight Mission. Brown invited Mitchell to visit the mission because he wanted to introduce the judge to the people who were helping him get his life back together. The president of Midnight Mission asked Mitchell if he was interested in working with them to help people who are homeless to gain self-sufficiency. Mitchell knew that running had played an important role in his own life and decided to start a running club. When the club started, there were only four consistent runners and they were known as the Midnight Runners. They later expanded to include participants from across the Skid Row area, and renamed themselves the Skid Row Running Club. As of 2019, more than 100 people run with the club, with each run averaging fifty participants. Members of the group include people who are homeless, police officers, people convicted of felonies, and lawyers.

The running club also helps members who are struggling with addiction in their efforts to remain sober. Many of the runners in the club serve as sobriety sponsors to runners who are new in their recovery. Runners who remain sober and in the running program are able to participate in an international marathon. The group has participated in many 5ks, marathons, and other races, including the L.A. Triathlon.

== In popular culture ==
In 2019, a documentary called "Skid Row Marathon" was made about the group. The film played in theaters across the United States on October 14, 2019.
