= Skid Row City Limits Mural =

Mural in Los Angeles

Coordinates: 34.043277°N 118.245787°W

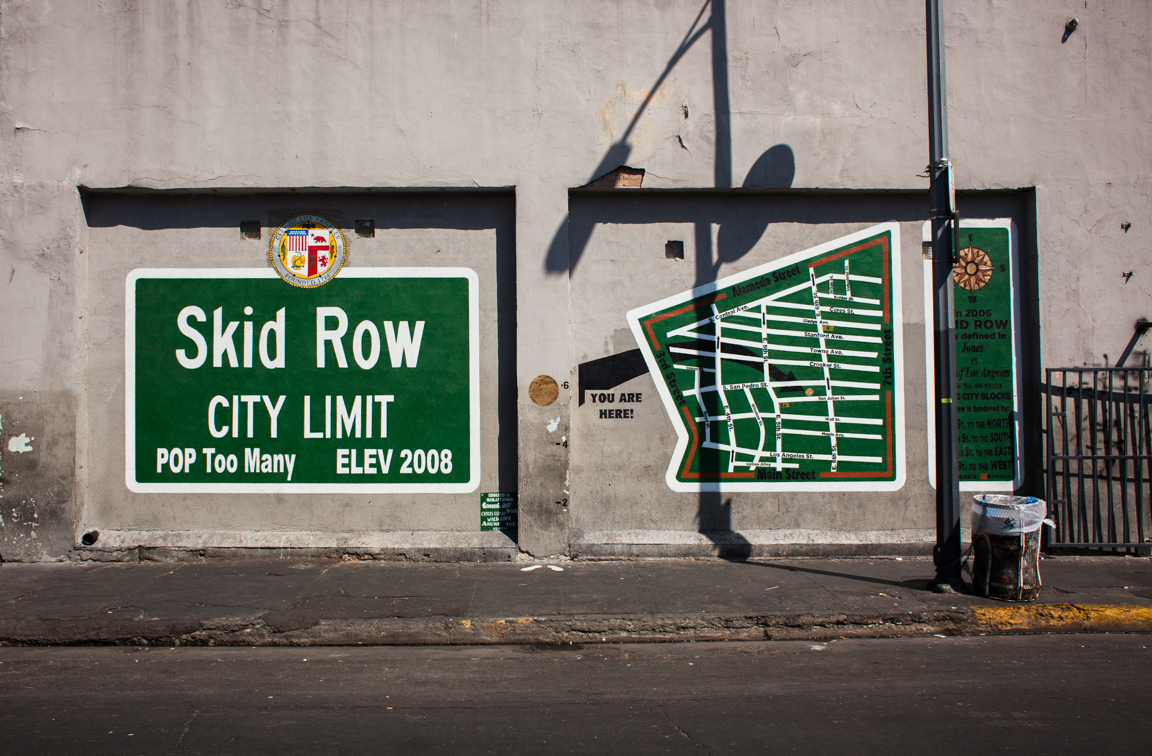
The Skid Row City Limit Mural in its original location

The Skid Row City Limit Mural is a 18-by-50-foot (5.5 by 15.2 m) mural displayed on San Julian Street in Los Angeles, California. It features a map demarcating Skid Row's legally recognized boundaries alongside an official-looking sign, replete with city seal, reading "Skid Row City Limit, Population: Too Many." It was the initial installation of a mural project that eventually covered the whole wall on the San Julian block just north of 6th Street (Closest address is 570 S San Julian St).

Installed in compliance with the city's mural ordinance, the project was created and organized by Skid Row community activist General Jeff Page for his Issues and Solutions organization, with mural installation led by local street art crew Winston Death Squad. It was carried out solely with volunteer labor from Skid Row citizens and without the aid of any non-profit service organizations. The piece represents a reaction to the growing practice among commercial groups of referring to historic areas of Skid Row with alternative designations. An adjacent companion piece titled "Skid Row Map" emphasizes Skid Row's historic and official significance with a citation of the 2006 Jones v. City of Los Angeles court decision that specifies Skid Row's physical boundaries as between Main and Alameda streets to the west and east, and Third and Seventh streets to the north and south.

Los Angeles City Councilman José Huizar's office has hailed the mural, saying, "It's community pride on the one hand, it's cleverly done and it creates conversation and debate, which often great public art does." In its annual street art review, LA Weekly named the Skid Row City Limit mural the city's best new street art mural of 2014.

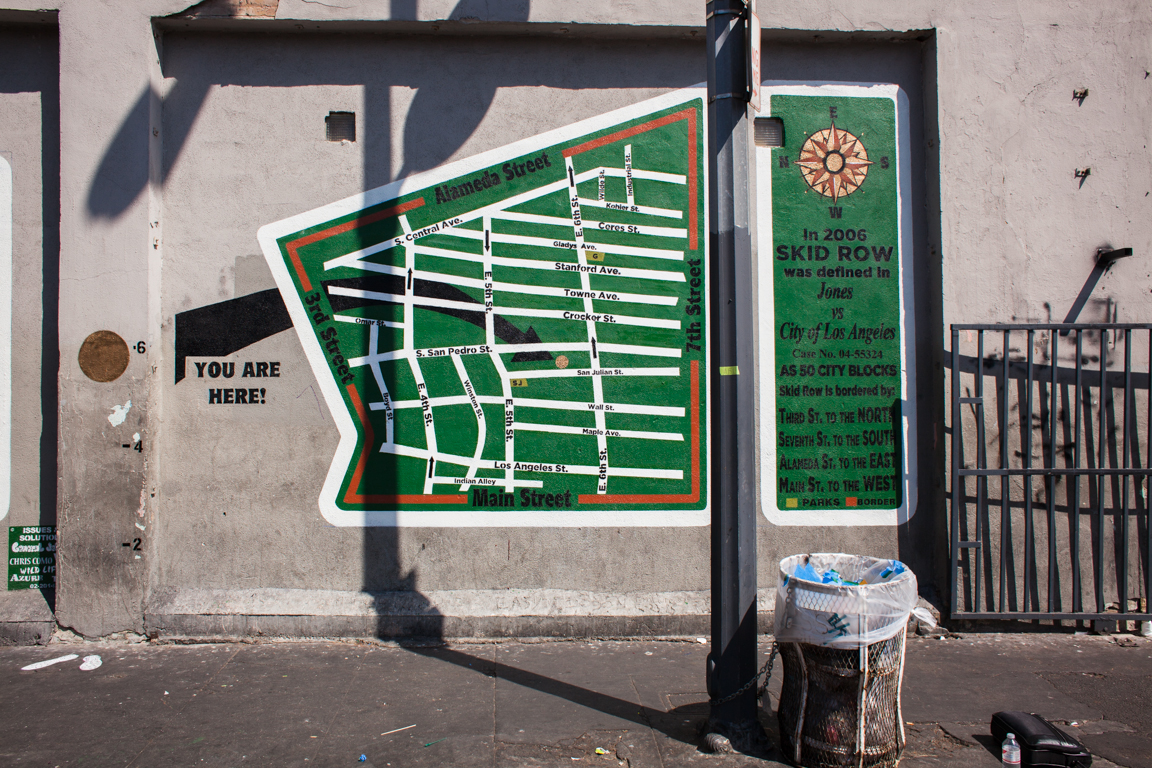
Closeup view of the map portion of the Skid Row City Limit Mural

The mural was destroyed in 2023 when the three-storey industrial building it was painted on was demolished and a new 5-over-1 constructed. A copy of the original mural was unveiled on the side of the new building in June 2024.

== See also ==
- Murals of Los Angeles
