= Run Dem Crew =

London based running crew

- Type: Urban running crew
- Founded: 2007 (19 years ago)
- Location: London
- Leader: Charlie Dark
- Website: www.rundemcrew.com

Run Dem Crew is a London based running crew founded in 2007 by DJ, poet and youth mentor Charlie Dark as “a running club for people who don’t consider themselves runners”. Their name is derived from the reggae group Scare Dem Crew. The crew originated with Dark and his mates running around east London but has since grown to several hundred people who meet every Tuesday. As a group they choose to differentiate themselves from a traditional running club as they are not registered with England Athletics and the emphasis is on family and community. Run Dem Crew are committed to change and work closely with young people across London providing mentoring and advice along with the opportunity to explore London in a safe, unique, positive and supportive environment. The crew are currently based at the Lululemon Store in Spitalfields Market.

Traditionally the group ran in speed groups such as Tortoises, Greyhounds, Hares, Cheetahs and Elites. Dark has recently foregone this method to focus on community culture at Brixton Street Gym.

Charlie Dark is also a Lululemon Global Running Ambassador, and has received a Points of Light award from the UK prime minister Theresa May for his dedication to establishing the alternative running community.

== Run Dem Crew Youngers ==
Charlie Dark has also created the Run Dem crew Youngers initiative, which brings the Run Dem Crew message and ethos to young people in London, giving them the tools and confidence to grow and change their lives and their community for the better.

== Membership ==
The crew rules are as follows:

- WE ARE NOT A RUNNING CLUB
- LEAVE YOUR EGO AT HOME

Run Dem Crew is open to all regardless of speed, class, colour, religion or creed.

== Associated groups ==
Due its success and size, the group has spawned several other London running crews including Track East as well as off shot community projects including Swim Dem Crew, Bike Dem Crew and Strong Dem Crew.

== Events ==
=== London Marathon ===
Since 2012, the group has organised a cheer zone at mile 21 of the London Marathon transforming it into a street party with music and confetti. The group are well known to place up to 300 signs across the route the night before the race to cheer on the participants.

=== 'Bridge the Gap' ===
Dark has made links globally with other run crews and hosts 'Bridge the Gap' events in London. Bridge The Gap is the movement that brings all of the global urban running crews together. Formed by founding father Mike Saes (New York City Bridgerunners) and Charlie Dark, Bridge The Gap connects running culture, lifestyle, music, art and creativity with events around the globe where crews come together to meet, run, create and party together. Other big crews in the movement include Paris Run Club, Patta Running Team, Black Roses, Berlin Braves, Harbour Runners and NBROoutta Copenhagen amongst others.
