= NYCRUNS =

Race organisation based in New York City

NYCRUNS, sometimes styled NYCRuns and formally New York City Runs, Inc. is a private for-profit New York City race organization company founded by Steve Lastoe that produces races throughout the five boroughs. The company averages three dozen races that serve 50,000 runners each year.

Among its most well known are the Empire State Building Run-Up and the Brooklyn Marathon. NYCRUNS won't be hosting its Brooklyn Marathon in 2024 but hosted its Brooklyn Half Marathon on April 28, 2024. As a result of a 2024 lawsuit filed by New York Road Runners, NYCRUNS was forced to change the name of its Brooklyn Half Marathon to the NYCRuns Brooklyn Experience Half Marathon.

From 2011 to 2016 the company operated the Yonkers Marathon, the second oldest in the United States. In August 2020, it hosted New York City's first in-person race following the COVID-19 shutdown.
