= Los Angeles Poverty Department =

Performance group in Los Angeles, U.S.

- Founded: 1985
- Founder: John Malpede
- Location: Skid Row, Los Angeles, CA
- Website: http://www.lapovertydept.org

The Los Angeles Poverty Department (LAPD) is a Los Angeles–based performance group closely tied to the city's Skid Row neighborhood. Founded in 1985 by director and activist John Malpede, LAPD members are mostly homeless or formerly homeless people.

== History ==
Performance artist John Malpede moved to Los Angeles from New York in 1984 to start work as an outreach paralegal at the Inner City Law Center (ICLC). He began leading theater workshops for the neighborhood's homeless population out of the ICLC's offices on Skid Row, gathering a group of performers and artists who now create their art as the Los Angeles Poverty Department (the acronym, LAPD, is a deliberate appropriation of that of the Los Angeles Police Department). At the time it was founded, the LAPD was the first theater by and for homeless people in the country and the first arts–based initiative for the Los Angeles homeless population. Material is often developed and rehearsed through community workshops and feedback sessions, continually evolving through conversation with the community. The ultimate enactment of ensemble members' lives in front of an audience seeks to transform the audience into witnesses rather than spectators.

In addition to ongoing workshops and the creation of new work, the LAPD's activities include touring of their repertory and commissions. Their community partnerships include SRO Housing, the L.A. Community Action Network, The Downtown Women's Action Coalition, St. Vincent DePaul Center, The Salvation Army's Women's and Men's drug recovery programs, and the Inner City Law Center.

== Exhibitions ==
- Do you want the cosmetic version or do you want the real deal? Los Angeles Poverty Department, 1985-2014. Retrospective. January 31-May 11, 2014. Queens Museum.

== Films ==
- The Real Deal. Documentary. Directed by Tom Jones. Written by Tom Jones and John Malpede. 2006.
