= Divine Madness Running Club =

Ultramarathon spiritual community

- Founded: Mid 1990s
- Head coach: Marc Tizer

Divine Madness Running Club is a spiritual community which promotes training for and running ultramarathons as a means for personal growth. The “club”/cult was founded by Marc Tizer in Boulder, Colorado in the 1990s, but now operates primarily from a ranch in New Mexico. Tizer, also known as Yousamien or Yo, is described as the organization's coach and also as its guru, and former members of the club have further called him a "manipulative, alcoholic, sex-addicted despot". Tizer's training methods include sleep deprivation, food withholding, and forcing club members to consume alcohol and have sex with him and with one another.

== Background ==
While running has become a casual exercise for fitness and weight reduction for many, Divine Madness pushes the outer edge of the sport's envelope, specializing in ultra marathons ranging from 50 to 100 miles. The running club is based in Boulder, Colorado.

The mainstream runners in the area are said to appreciate the discipline and the achievements of the club. Some mainstream runners have likened the club to a cult, due to the club often being more than just a running club. The leader of the club is Yo Tizer, who is often referred to as a teacher rather than a leader. He was quoting saying he preferred the club to be referred to as a “school” or a “community.”

For his own runners, he will often test their adaptability by tacking on extra miles in the middle of a training run; group members are urged to finish each run, working through any pain barriers. The top Divine Madness runners live in a rental house in Boulder. Other members of the group, whose ages range from 24 to 59, also live in communal clusters of five or six people.

Not everyone agrees with the methods employed. In a civil lawsuit filed in late 1996, Georgiana Scott, John Hunt and Melissa Huntress claim that rather than liberating members of the group, Tizer controlled them through fasting, sleep deprivation, isolation from friends and family and the prohibition of monogamy. Some members after leaving the group have also voiced their issues about the club.

== Preparation ==
A frequent competitor and previous champion Steve Peterson was known for taking 55-mile training runs in order to prepare his body and mind for the events. Peterson at the time was about to defend his title in the Leadville Trail 100. Some runners such as Peterson believe it is a much larger effort adhering to Eastern spiritual traditions, meditation and holistic healing methods. The preparation methods have also featured in the book Born to Run.

== Contributors ==
Fred Pilon, the publisher of UltraRunning Magazine, estimates that there are 8,000 Americans who run ultra marathons, which is defined as anything above the standard 26.2-mile marathon. That group includes Joe Schlereth of Fresno, Calif., who ran 9,021 miles in 1996 (173.5 miles a week), and the Sri Chinmoy Marathon Team of Jamaica, Queens, which began a 3,100-mile race, around a city block, on June 13 with a 51-day time limit. Most ultrarunners, Pilon said, are hobbyists who average 50–60 miles per week.

== Training Methods ==
Divine Madness is known for using unconventional training methods. They use a method called muscle testing, where downward pressure is applied to a runner’s outstretched arm. It is said that experts in this technique can determine muscle strength, emotional state, nutritional need and the correct fit of a running shoe. Tizer has been known to jump in the middle of a group of elite runners at Bolder Boulder, a popular annual 10-kilometer race, to briefly get a close look at their running form.

Divine Madness runners succeed by training in groups, as do Kenyan and Mexican distance runners.

Associated with the group are a personal trainer, a physical therapist, a sports psychologist, a nutritionist and a registered nurse. Runners eat twice a day, adhering to a regulated diet of carefully chosen proportions. The organic diet is 40 percent fat, 20 percent protein and 40 percent carbohydrates.

The group also uses some unusual running techniques, such as a pronounced swinging of the hips, which is designed to rely more on the natural range of motion of the body's joints rather than the burning of muscle fuel for propulsion.

The Divine Madness runners, who average 120–130 miles a week, do a 30-mile training run each Wednesday and are a fixture on the trails in Boulder on Sundays when they run for 25 to 50 miles, which can require eight or more hours.

== Sexual Harassment ==
In late 1996, Georgiana Scott, John Hunt, and Melissa Huntress filed a lawsuit claiming that rather than liberating members of the group, Tizer controlled them through fasting, sleep deprivation, and isolation from the members' family and their friends.

It alleges that Tizer required that female clients sleep with himself and a number of other community clients before being allowed to have sexual contact with their partners. Anyone who tried to leave the group or change the norm was subject to physical illness and emotional destruction.

A fourth former member of the group, Michele Hirsen, recently filed a complaint with the Boulder police department alleging that Tizer sexually assaulted her. In her report to the police, Hirsen said that in his role as spiritual guide and teacher, Tizer always made himself more available to his female students. Hirsen said the following about the subject:

There's not a lot of room for an individual to have a self, he has emotional and psychological control over everyone around him. He's a manipulative, diabolical person. He has a system where he tries to seduce any woman who comes across his path without concern for their boundaries and sensitivities. Many women felt confused and violated by these interactions.

== Envelope Marriage ==
In 1989 Yo Tizer began a practice of "envelope marriage", where one male and one female member would each have their name drawn from a hat and then they were "married" for a week in order to break them from their "attachment" to choosing partners. He advised them that he could control fertility by muscle testing and herbs. When the women often became pregnant he would order them to have abortions to break their "attachments" to being mothers. Except for his own children, who he allowed to be born and raised in The Community, and for several women whom he deemed so pathologically self-centered that they needed to be broken of their "attachment" to themselves.
