= Safer Cities Initiative =

Initiative to reduce crime

The Safer Cities Initiative is an initiative to reduce crime in Skid Row, Los Angeles. While the initiative prominently resulted in heightened police enforcement in Skid Row, it had other facets including prosecuting hospitals who dumped poor patients at Skid Row, as well as services like tree trimming.

== History ==
Skid Row, Los Angeles had a high rate of crime compared to other regions of the city. In 2005, Los Angeles Police Department undertook a pilot program called "Main Street Pilot Project", seeking to reduce the density of homeless encampments in Skid Row. The Safer Cities Initiative was officially announced on September 24, 2006 by Los Angeles mayor Antonio Villaraigosa. Fifty officers were hired for the Safer Cities Initiative Task Force, which focused on an area less than 1 mi^{2} (2.6 km^{2}).

It evolved from the broken windows theory of crime. Other counterparts across the US were mass drug arrests in Tulia, Texas and removing homeless people from public spaces in Seattle.

== Results ==
=== Enforcement action and effect on crime rates ===
In the first year of the SCI, 12,000 citations were issued, the majority for pedestrian violations. About 750 arrests were made each month, 55% of which were drug-related offenses. Few arrests were for serious violent crimes like homicide (1 arrest), robbery (8 arrests), aggravated assault (13 arrests), or rape (no arrests).

Analysis of crime trends in Skid Row showed several changes in nuisance crime, property crime, or violent crime. Nuisance crime decreased in the target area, but also decreased in other areas. The impact of the SCI therefore had a small impact on the level of nuisance crime. Similarly, while property and violent crime decreased in Skid Row, it also declined in the city as a whole. Some evidence suggested a gradual downward trend in property and violent crime in Skid Row that could be attributed to the SCI.

=== Cost ===
SCI was criticized for its costs. It cost $6 million annually just for personnel costs for the fifty officers. This was more than the city's annual budget ($5.6 million) for all homeless shelters and services. With each arrest costing Los Angeles about $4,300, SCI arrests cost the city $118 million by 2009.

=== Social impact ===
The executive director of LAMP Community, a nonprofit in Skid Row that works on issues and services for homeless people, criticized SCI, saying the entire premise was "to invest enormous police resources into very, very petty things, which are really a consequence of someone's illness or a consequence of having to survive on the streets." The Los Angeles Community Action Network called for an end to the Initiative in 2010 with petitions and a report, saying that it resulted in human rights violations for residents of Skid Row, many of whom expressed that they did not feel safe from police violence and harassment.

Sociologist Alex S. Vitale criticized the SCI and said it should not be replicated in other cities due to its failure to reduce homelessness prevalence, its high cost, and its modest effect on crime reduction. Because monetary fines were levied against people without the means to pay them, the citations turned into arrest warrants. In a fourteen-month period, 1,200 people were arrested in the SCI targeted area for unpaid citations. Vitale also noted that targeting drug offenses also caused a cascade of other effects. Though a majority of drug distribution charges from the SCI involved quantities of drugs valued at less than $20, conviction on drug distribution charges has consequences such as permanent ineligibility for public housing, federal financial aid for college, food stamps, federal job training programs, and Temporary Assistance for Needy Families (welfare). Drug-related convictions also make it more challenging for people to find employment and support themselves.

Skid Row residents became "copwise" through their numerous interactions with law enforcement via the SCI, becoming more skillful at avoiding officers' attention. Residents also implemented a Community Watch to document police officer behavior, or "police the police". Resistance strategies against some of these policing tactics eventually resulted in a legal injunction that prevented routine confiscation of property by law enforcement.
