= Attica Blues (band) =

British trip hop band

- Genres: Trip hop
- Years active: 1995–present
- Labels: Mo' Wax
- Members: D'Afro; Tony Nwachukwu; Roba El-Essawy

Attica Blues are a British trip hop band, who made their debut releases on the Mo' Wax label. Taking their name from an Archie Shepp album, the band have also provided remixes for Ultra Naté, Sneaker Pimps, Silent Poets and DJ Krush.

== History ==
The group began life in 1994 when producers D'Afro and Tony Nwachukwu first met up. D'Afro had previously founded London's Urban Poets Society collective but the duo later became Attica Blues. While trying to sell some Japanese hip-hop records, D'Afro met up with Mo'Wax founder James Lavelle and was offered a spot on his Mo'Wax label despite never having made music before. The duo began recording their first single alone but when a local student, the Egyptian-born Roba El-Essawy, visited the studio during the recording for their debut single, D'Afro and Nwachukwu decided to ask her to join them. The band released their first single in 1995 and their debut album in 1997.

El-Essawy was married to painter Chris Ofili from 2002 to 2019.

El-Essawy released her debut solo release under the name MidnightRoba in 2021. The album, titled Golden Seams, was written and produced by MidnightRoba and self-released to her Bandcamp page.

Attica Blues have in recent years been back in the studio and are teasing a comeback with a third studio album.

== Discography ==
=== Albums ===
- Attica Blues (Mo' Wax, 1997)
- Test. Don't Test (Columbia, 2000)
- Attica Blues Present Drum Major Instinct (Ex:treme, 2001)

=== Singles ===
- Vibes, Scribes 'N' Dusty 45's EP (Mo' Wax, 1994)
- "Blueprint" (Mo' Wax, 1995)
- "3ree (A Means to Be)" (Mo' Wax, 1997)
- "Tender" (Mo' Wax, 1997)
- "Oh La La La" (1998)
- "What Do You Want?" (2000)
