= Chinese Music Ensemble of New York =

US non-profit orchestra

The Chinese Music Ensemble of New York
- Origin: New York City
- Genres: Chinese music, world music
- Years active: 1961–present
- Labels: Chesky
- Past members: Tsuan-nien Chang
- Website: Official Website

The Chinese Music Ensemble of New York is a non-profit Chinese orchestra founded in 1961 and consisting of about fifty members. One of the missions of the group is to spread awareness of Chinese music in the West.

The orchestra performs spring and fall concerts each year at Merkin Hall in Manhattan, as well as offering programs for the community, workshops, and lectures on Chinese music.

They have also performed at Carnegie Hall, Lincoln Center, and the Newport Music Festival.

The orchestra holds a summer program for children, offering lessons in Dizi, Erhu, and Yangqin.

== Discography ==
- Beloved Chinese Songs (Chesky, 1995)
- Music for a New World (Chesky, 1998)
