= Brooklyn Marathon =

Long distance race

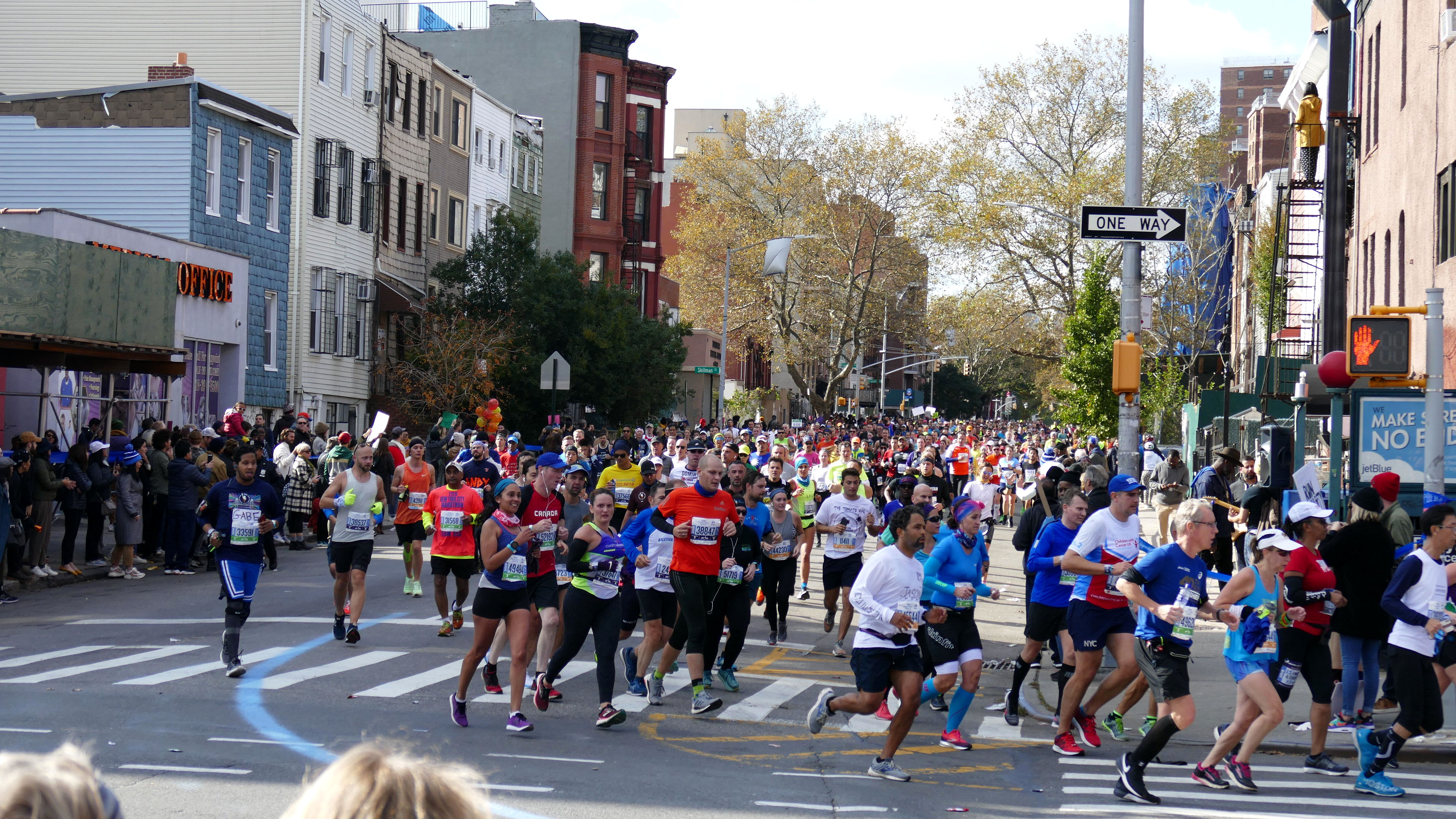
2019 NYC Marathon at Lafayette and Bedford Avenue

The Brooklyn Marathon was a marathon run in Brooklyn, New York City from 2011 to 2022. It was produced by NYCRUNS in the fall. The 2011 debut was centered around Prospect Park. The race generated enough support that plans for new courses began in 2013.

The race returned in 2022 following the COVID-19 pandemic with a new course that went from Williamsburg to Prospect Park. A half marathon was also run on the same day. During the race in April 2022, they were expected to have 20,000 participants. The 2022 race had $100,000 total in prize money and the winners of each category were: From New York City, the winner of the non-binary field was Jake Caswell; From Ethiopia, the winner of the women's field was Hirut Guangul. From New York City, the winner of the men's field was Aaron Mora. The marathon also had the largest nonbinary group with a total of 82 finishers which also includes the half-marathon. NYCRUNS partnered with Adidas on a multi-year contract. Adidas agreed to make attire for all athletes and staff members participating in the event.

In 2023, the race was limited to the half marathon distance and had 11,000 finishers.

The future name of the race is unknown following a 2024 lawsuit by New York Road Runners, which operates an older Brooklyn Half Marathon.
