= Charlie Dark =

Musician and entrepreneur

Charlie Dark MBE
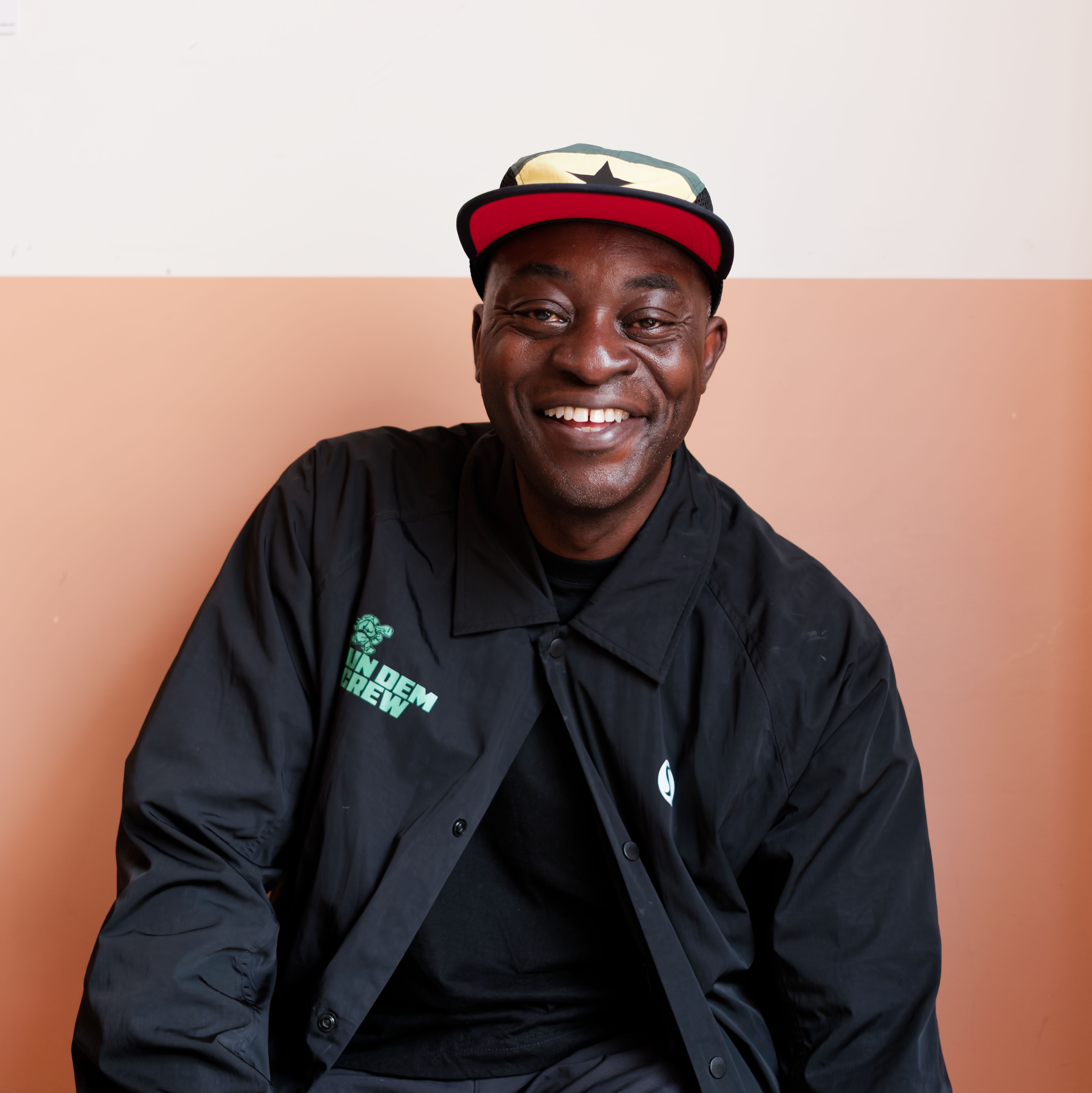
- Charlie Dark in 2026
- Born: Charlie Williams
- Known for: Run Dem Crew

Charlie Dark is a poet, DJ, co-founder of Attica Blues, and founder of Run Dem Crew. Dark is also a Lululemon Global Running Ambassador.

In 2023, Dark was awarded an MBE, as part of the birthday honours list, for services to running and to young people.

== Career ==
=== Musician ===
Dark, under the name the of D'Afro, was part of the trip hop band Attica Blues, which released their debut single Blueprint in 1995.

=== DJ ===
Dark started DJing from the age of thirteen while still in school in south east London.

=== Running ===
Dark founded the London based running crew Run Dem Crew in 2007. Dark received a Points of Light award from the UK prime minister Theresa May for his dedication to establishing the alternative running community.

=== Poet ===
Dark has been a poet coach for the London Teenage Poetry Slam.
