= Skid Row, Los Angeles =

Neighborhood in the US

Skid Row Central City East
- Neighborhood
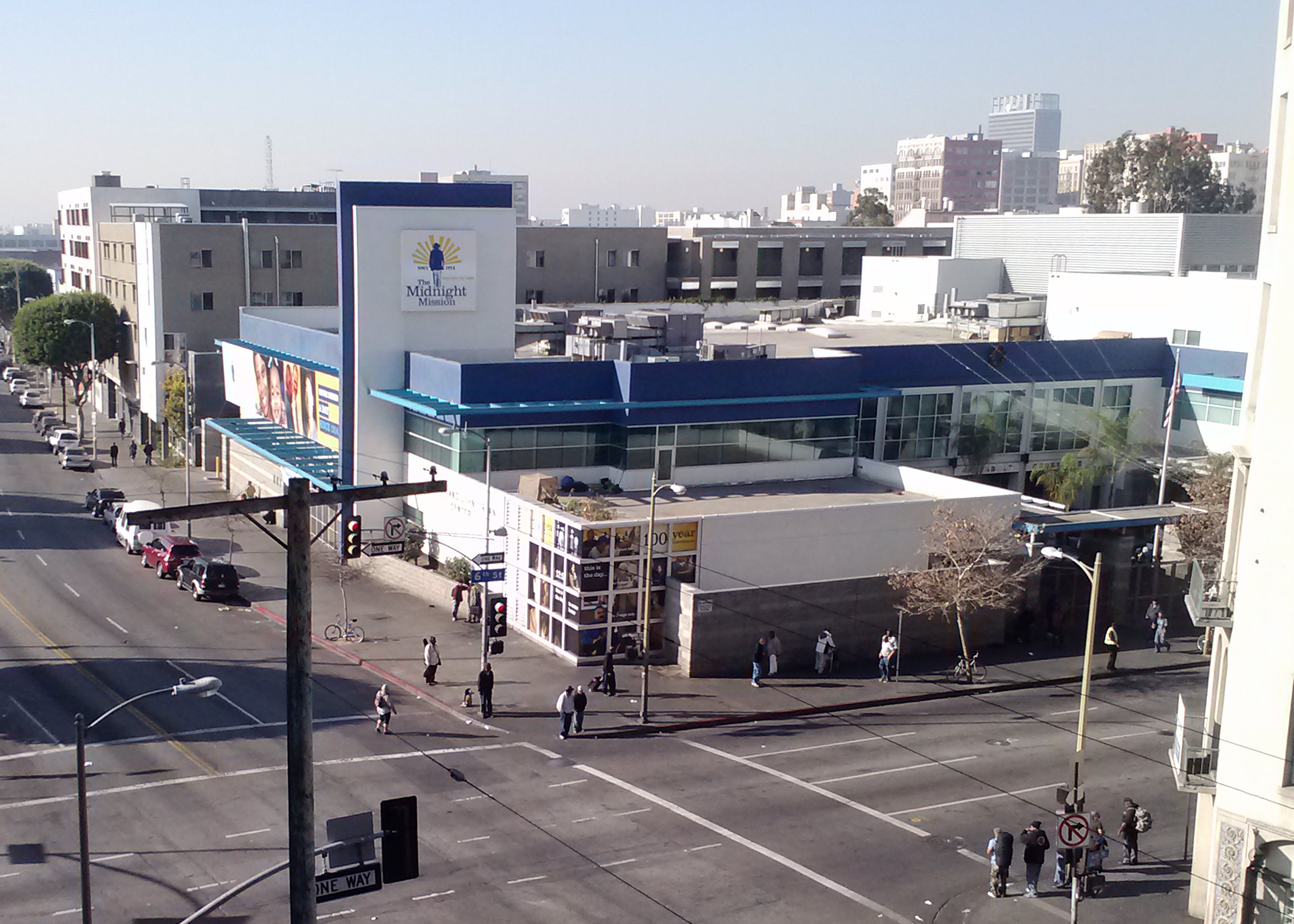
- The Midnight Mission on Skid Row, 2014

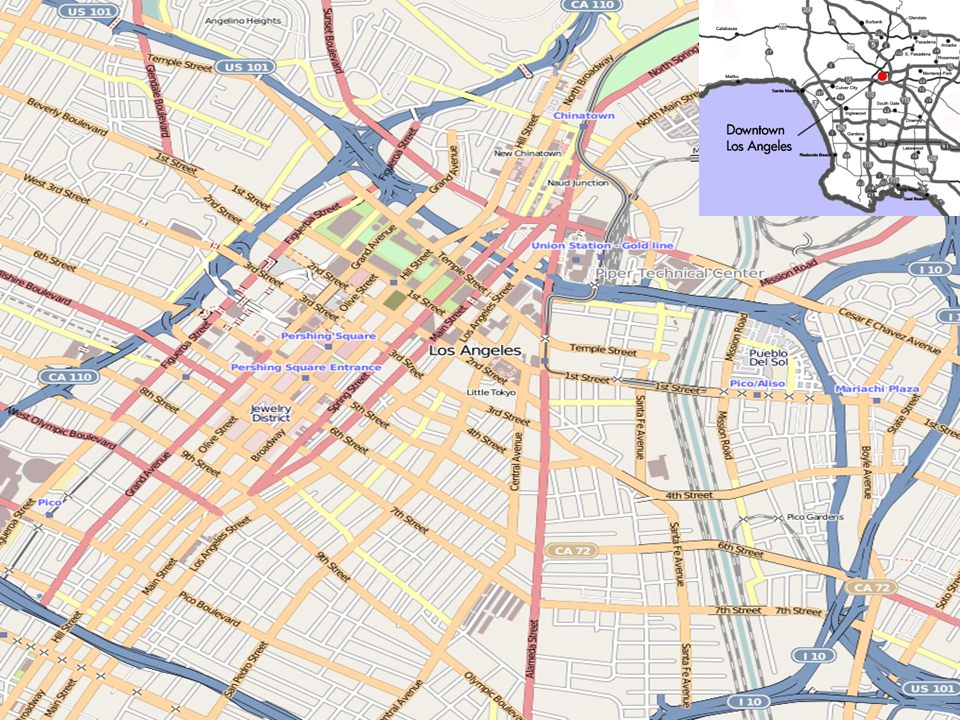
- Location within Downtown Los Angeles
- Coordinates: 34°02′39″N 118°14′38″W
- Country: United States
- State: California
- County: Los Angeles
- City: Los Angeles

Government
  - City Council: Ysabel Jurado
  - State Assembly: Sade Elhawary (D)
  - State Senate: Lola Smallwood-Cuevas (D)
  - U.S. House: Jimmy Gomez (D)

Area
  - Total: 0.431 sq mi (1.12 km^{2})
- ZIP Code: 90013
- Area code: 213

Skid Row is the unofficial name for a neighborhood in Downtown Los Angeles officially known as Central City East.

Skid Row contains one of the largest stable populations of homeless people in the United States, estimated at over 4,400, and has been known for its condensed homeless population since at least the 1930s. Its long history of police raids, targeted city initiatives, and homelessness advocacy makes it one of the most notable districts in Los Angeles.

Covering 50 city blocks immediately east of downtown Los Angeles, Skid Row is bordered by Third Street to the north, Seventh Street to the south, Alameda Street to the east, and Main Street to the west.

== Etymology ==
The term "skid row" or "skid road," referring to an area of a city where people live who are "on the skids," derives from a logging term. Loggers would transport their logs to a nearby river by sliding them down roads made from greased skids. Loggers who had accompanied the load to the bottom of the road would wait there for transportation back up the hill to the logging camp. By extension, the term began to be used for places where people with no money or employment gathered, becoming the generic term in North America for a depressed street in a city.

== Demographics ==
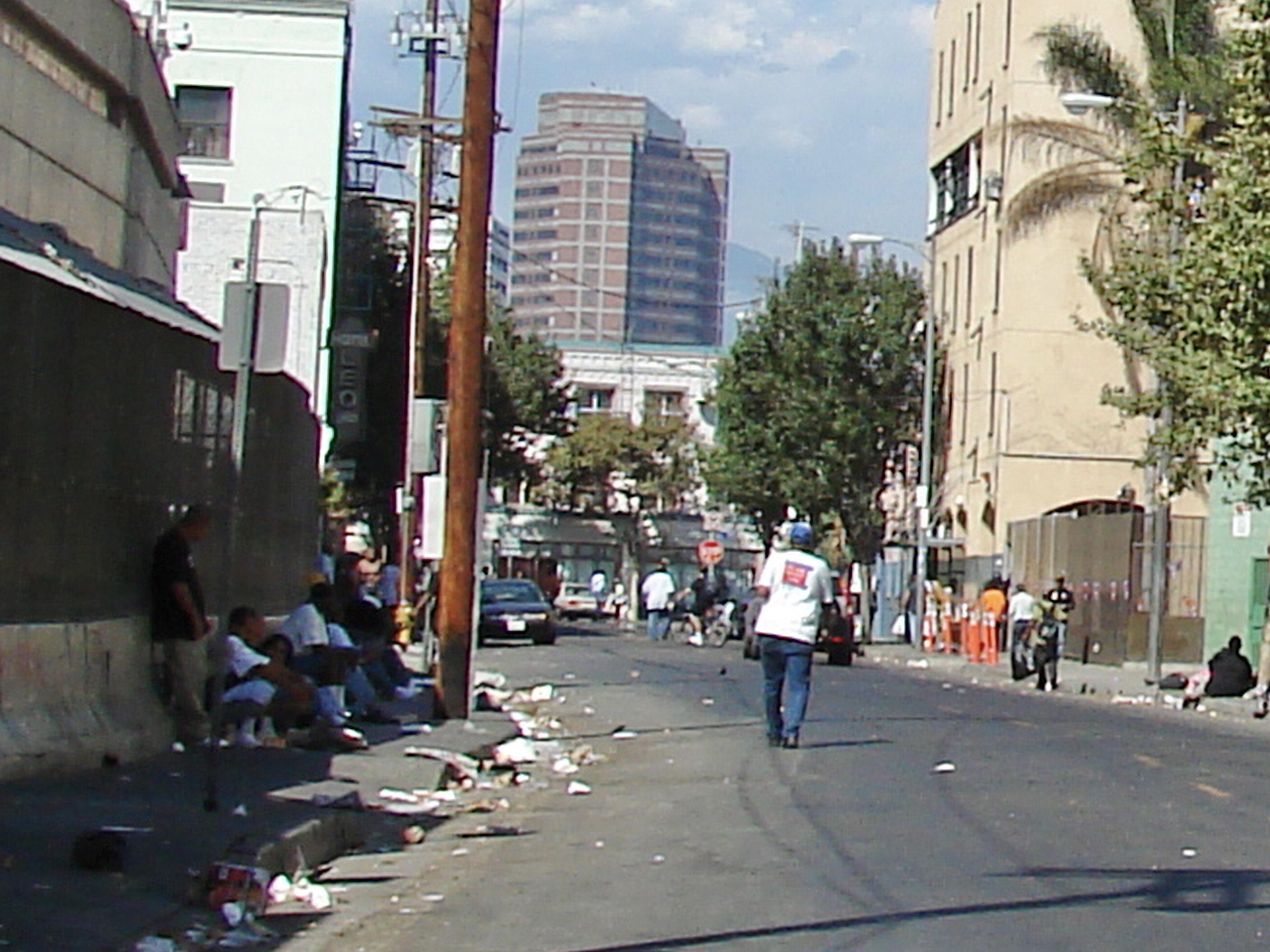
San Julian Street south of 5th Street, 2006

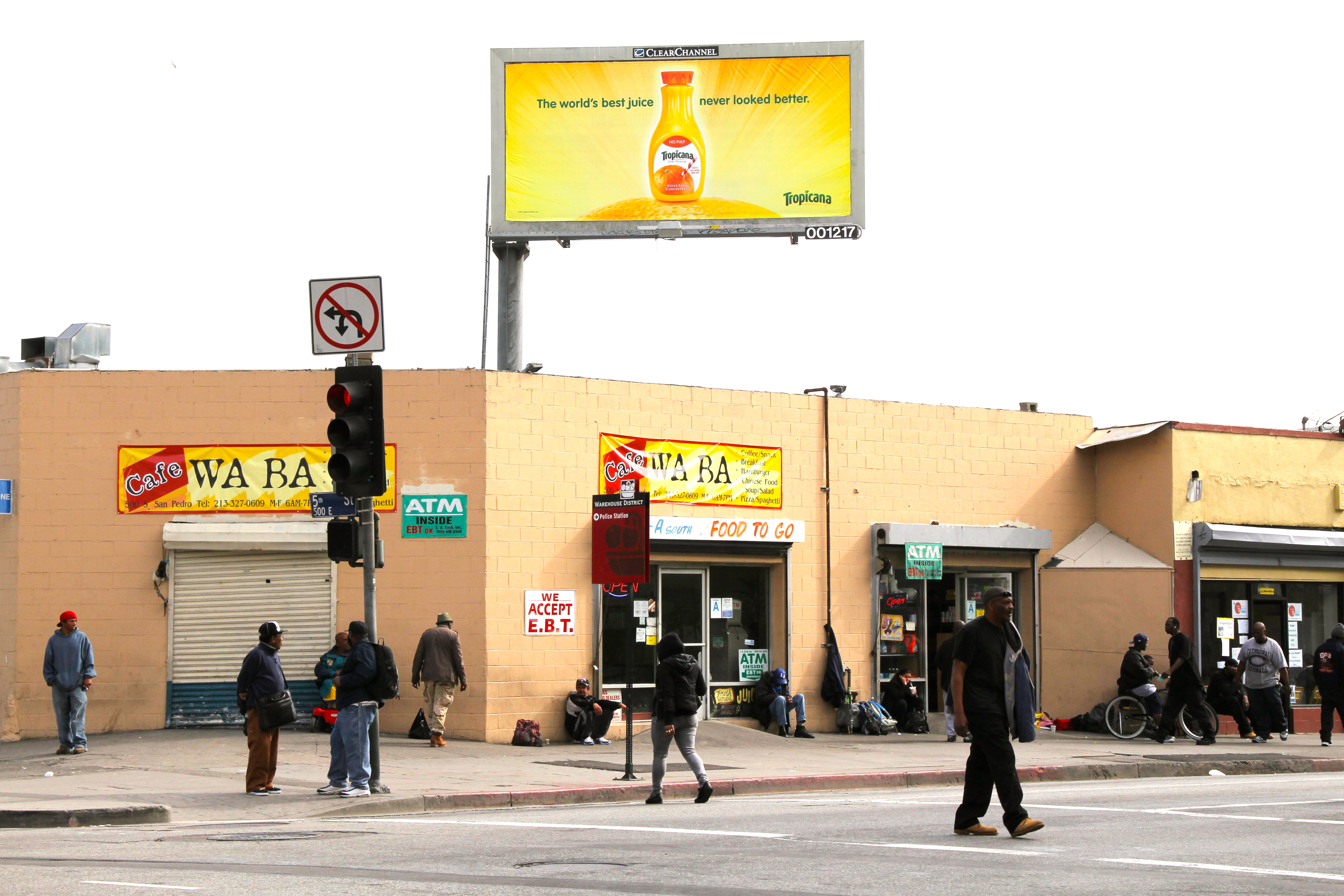
Corner of San Pedro Street and East Fifth Street, 2011

In 2019, the Central City East's racial demographics consisted of 39.7% Black/African American, 22.3% White, 16.3% Asian, 15.1% Hispanic or Latino, 2.5% American Indian/Alaska Native, 0.6% Native Hawaiian / Other Pacific Islander, 3.1% 2+ races, and 0.5% other races.

According to the city's data, 53.1% of the population were born in California, 27.0% were born in another state, 18.8% were born in another country, and 1.1% were native residents born outside of the United States.

The population was estimated to be approximately 10,850 individuals over 0.392 square miles, though there is currently no up-to-date approximation due to limited data. In 2023, the Los Angeles Longitudinal Enumeration and Demographic Survey estimated that the population increased by 13% after the COVID-19 pandemic, though no exact population estimate was provided. Out of the 10,850 estimated to be in the population, 7,004 were identified as male, and 3,574 were identified as female.

The age groups in the region were spread out with 7.78% being under the age of 18, 1.38% from 18 to 24, 60.94% from 25 to 54, 19.49% from 55 to 61, and 10.41% who were 62 years of age or older. The median age for the male population was 50.9 years, and the median age for the female population was 50.3 years. Among these numbers, veterans made up 9.90% of the 10,850.

The per capita income for the neighborhood in 2000 was $14,210. About 41.8% of the population were below the poverty line. In 2008, the median household income for Skid Row and the surrounding areas was $15,003. In 2019, the median household income for Skid Row residents was approximately $12,070, where 68.9% of the population was below the poverty line. The overall income for Skid Row continued to be below the poverty line at the time, with $67,418 being the average median house income for the Greater Los Angeles population. In 2019, the average household size was 9.9 people living in a single unit. 60.2% of the households in Skid Row were family households consisting of married-couple families with children, 25.2% were single-mother households, and 18.7% were married-couple families.

== History ==
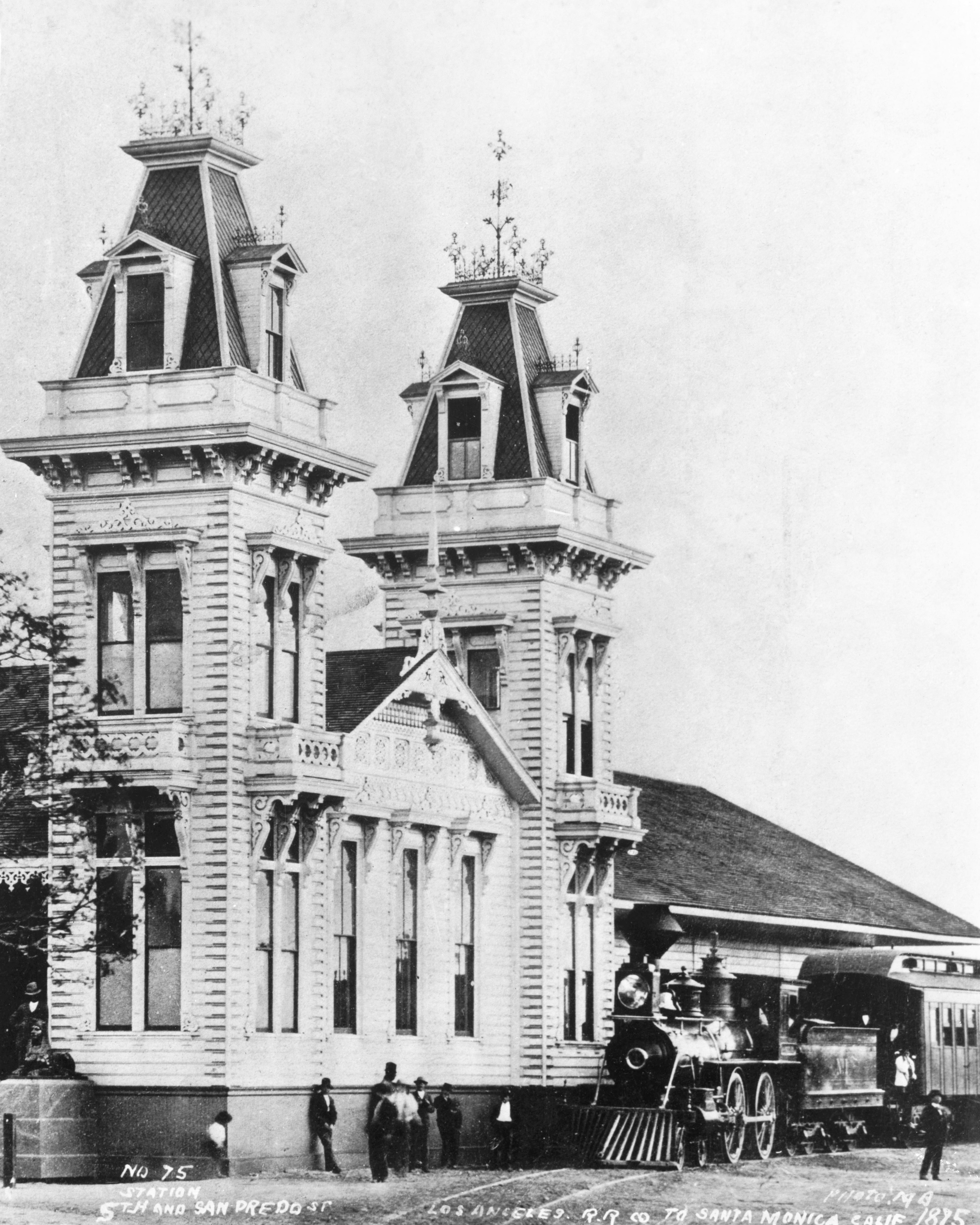
The corner of 5th and San Pedro in 1875

=== 1880s through 1960s ===
At the end of the 19th century, a number of residential hotels opened in the area as it became home to a transient population of seasonal laborers. By the 1930s, Skid Row was home to as many as 10,000 homeless people. It supported saloons, residential hotels, and social services, which drew people from the populations they served to congregate in the area.

When railroads were constructed on the outskirts of the downtown area the agricultural fields to the east transitioned into industrial zones. These industrial areas attracted a predominantly transient male workforce, many of whom traveled by train seeking employment in railroad-related industries or seasonal work in agriculture. It became "an enclave of small hotels, movie theaters and cheap eateries that served transient workers in seasonal industries and nearby railroads".

Skidrow Serenade

The population is probably more motley than that in a similar district of any other American city. Jews, Greeks, and Italians in the doorways of pawnshops and secondhand clothing stores vie with one another to lure the unwary passer-by inside. A fat German runs a beer parlor and just across the street a dapper Frenchman ladles up 5-cent bowls of split pea soup. A large, blond woman named Sunshine, born in Egypt, manages one of the cleaner rooming houses. A few Chinese practically monopolize the hand laundry business, and Japanese the cheapest cafes and flophouses. American Indians barter for forbidden whiskey. Chattering Mexicans loiter on the steps leading up to a second-floor hotel. Dapper Negroes, better dressed than any other vagabonds, wander by in riotous groups.

— Huston Irvine, Los Angeles Times (March 26, 1939)

In June 1947, Los Angeles Police Department (LAPD) chief Clemence B. Horrall ordered what he called a "blockade raid" of the whole Skid Row area. Over 350 people were arrested. Assistant Chief Joseph Reed, who claimed that "at least 50 percent of all the crime in Los Angeles originates in the Skid Row area," stated that there had been no "strong arm robberies" on Skid Row as late as one week after the raid. Long time residents, however, were skeptical that the changes would last.

In the 1950s, the area "evolved into a place where alcoholics and other people down on their luck could get a meal and a bed". In 1956, the city of Los Angeles was in the midst of a program to "rehabilitate" Skid Row through the clearance of decaying buildings. The program was presented to property owners in the area as an economy measure. Gilbert Morris, then superintendent of building, said that at that point the provision of free social services to the approximately one square mile of Skid Row cost the city over $5 million per year as opposed to the city average of $110,000 per square mile annually. The city used administrative hearings to compel the destruction of nuisance properties at the expense of the owner. By July 1960, the clearance program was said to be 87% complete in the Skid Row area. With increased building codes during the 1960s, owners of residential hotels found demolition to be more cost-effective than adhering to repairs. The total number of these units is estimated to have dropped from 15,000 to 7,500 over the following decade. Many residents of the area found themselves homeless with the loss of half of the affordable housing provided by hotels.

=== 1970s containment zone ===
Skid Row was established by city officials in 1976 as an unofficial "containment zone", where shelters and services for homeless people would be tolerated.

During the 1970s, two Catholic Workers — Catherine Morris, a former nun, and her husband, Jeff Dietrich — founded the "Hippie Kitchen" in the back of a van. Over forty years later, in March 2019, aged 84 and 72, they remained active in their work feeding Skid Row residents.

Throughout the 1960s and 1970s, many Vietnam veterans found themselves drawn to Skid Row, due to the services and missions already in place there and feeling outcast from other areas. Like those after World War II, many of them ended up on the streets. It was around this time that the demographics of Skid Row shifted from predominantly White and elderly to those there today (see: Demographics).

=== 1987 crackdowns ===
In February 1987, LAPD chief Daryl Gates, backed by then-Mayor Tom Bradley, announced plans for another crackdown on the homeless on Skid Row. Police and firefighters conducted a number of sweeps through the area but the plan was abandoned due to opposition by advocates for the homeless.

When Gates announced in May that the crackdown would resume, Los Angeles City Attorney (and future mayor) James K. Hahn responded that he would not prosecute people arrested in the planned sweeps. Hahn stated that he was "not going to prosecute individuals for not having a place to stay. I simply will not prosecute people for being poor, underprivileged and unable to find a place to sleep until I'm convinced that a viable alternative to sleeping on the streets exists." Gates, still backed by Bradley, responded: "As the elected city attorney of Los Angeles, Mr. Hahn has a responsibility to file prosecutable cases which are presented to him by the Los Angeles Police Department."

A few days later, then-Councilman Zev Yaroslavsky introduced a proposal that the city stop enforcing its anti-camping laws on Skid Row until adequate housing could be found for all its residents. The council rejected Yaroslavsky's proposal, but after hearing testimony from Assistant Police Chief David Dotson describing the LAPD's intended crackdown methodology, the council passed a motion asking Gates not to enforce the anti-camping laws until adequate housing could be found for the area's residents.

=== 2000s patient dumping ===
In September 2005, hospitals and law enforcement agencies were discovered to be "dumping" homeless people on Skid Row. Then-Mayor Antonio Villaraigosa ordered an investigation and William Bratton, LAPD chief at the time, claimed that the department was not targeting homeless people specifically, but only people who violated city ordinances. The Los Angeles City Attorney investigated more than 50 of about 150 reported cases of dumping. By early 2007, the city attorney had filed charges against only one hospital, Kaiser Permanente. Because there were no laws specifically covering the hospital's actions, it was charged, in an untested strategy, with false imprisonment. In response to the lack of legal recourse available to fight patient dumping, California state senator Gil Cedillo sponsored legislation against it in February 2007.

Since Mike Feuer took office as City Attorney in 2013, he settled eight additional cases of patient dumping with various hospitals around Los Angeles. These cases have been a part of a larger attempt to solve the issue, in addition to working with some hospitals on long-term solutions. The total settlements from all eight have been over four million dollars.

=== 2000 to 2009 ===
In 2002, newly appointed LAPD Chief William Bratton announced a plan to clean up Skid Row by, among other things, enforcing the anti-camping ordinance. A man named Robert Lee Purrie was cited twice and arrested for violating the ordinance in December 2002 and January 2003. His possessions, consisting of his tent, "blankets, clothes, cooking utensils, a hygiene kit, and other personal effects", were thrown into the street by the police. In April 2006, United States Court of Appeals for the Ninth Circuit ruled in favor of the American Civil Liberties Union (ACLU) in its suit against the city of Los Angeles, filed on behalf of Purrie and five other homeless people, finding that the city was in violation of the 8th and 14th Amendments to the U.S. Constitution and sections of the California Constitution guaranteeing due process and equal protection and prohibiting cruel and unusual punishment in reference to Robinson v. California. The court stated that "the Eighth Amendment prohibits the City from punishing involuntary sitting, lying, or sleeping on public sidewalks that is an unavoidable consequence of being human and homeless without shelter in the City of Los Angeles." The court described the anti-camping ordinance as "one of the most restrictive municipal laws regulating public spaces in the United States."

The ACLU sought a compromise in which the LAPD would be barred from arresting homeless people or confiscating their possessions on Skid Row between the hours of 9:00 p.m. and 6:30 a.m. The compromise plan, which was accepted by the city of Los Angeles, permits sleeping on the sidewalk except "within 10 feet of any business or residential entrance" and only between these hours.

Downtown development business interests and the Central City East Association (CCEA) came out against the compromise. On September 20, 2006, the Los Angeles City Council voted to reject the compromise. On October 3, 2006, police arrested Skid Row's transients for sleeping on the streets for the first time in months. On October 10, 2006, under pressure from the ACLU, the city tacitly agreed to the compromise by declining to appeal the court's decision.

=== 2006 Safer Cities Initiative ===
The Safer Cities Initiative (SCI) was a 68-week policy implemented in 2006 by the Los Angeles Police Department dealing with homeless encampments in Skid Row. The policy, led by former police chief William Bratton, assigned approximately 50 police officers to the Skid Row area to enforce stricter policing of offenses in accordance with the broken windows theory of policing. Through policing these offenses (including non-violent offenses such as jaywalking or littering), the LAPD sought to establish a heightened appearance of public order as a punitive deterrent for criminals. One study by the LAPD claimed that four years post-implementation, crime rates had reduced by approximately 46%, while deaths dropped approximately 34%.

While the Los Angeles Police Department has stood by the policy's effectiveness and its impact on the local community, one study suggested that while crime rates have reduced, higher incarceration rates were a contributing factor to the area's increasing homeless population. The 27,000 arrests over the duration of the short time period of 2005 to 2009, with 1,200 of those arrests being among the SCI's targeted unhoused population for unpaid citations, showcase the community's concerns for the Safer Cities Initiative tactics for targeting homelessness. These claims have been echoed by local activists, who argue that the initiative's frequent use of arrest warrants and tickets prevented individuals in-need from acquiring long-term housing and career opportunities.

=== 2010s ===
In 2012, the Skid Row Running Club was founded by Los Angeles Superior Court Judge Craig Mitchell, as an effort to improve the livelihood of those in the area. A documentary titled “Skid Row Marathon” was made about the group, which includes homeless people, police officers, and convicted felons.

The city came to an agreement in May 2019 that removed the limit on the number of possessions kept on the street in the neighborhood. The agreement allows the city to still seize any items that threaten public safety and health, as well as large “bulky items.” This includes most pieces of furniture or appliances. Items that do not fall into those categories will be stored for 90 days. If an item is deemed important enough, such as medication, it must be able to be claimed within 24 hours.

=== 2020s COVID-19 pandemic ===
During the COVID-19 pandemic, the requirement of individuals to take down their tents for sidewalk cleanings was suspended, with the intent of not displacing people during the cleanings, which might spread COVID-19.

Another issue at the time was maintaining hygiene at a time when strict sanitation protocols were recommended. An LA Times reporter, James Queally, wrote about the effect of the city's mandated lockdown orders and strict protocols on the citizens. The closing down of public restrooms, stores and gyms made it hard for many in the area, primarily the homeless, to clean up. In an effort to resolve this, Los Angeles city officials set up 360 hand washing stations and a dozen mobile shower trucks. To offer more resources, recreation centers were turned into housing shelters.

== Culture ==
Skid Row is home to many artists. Due to its location bordering districts such as the Historic Core and the Arts District, Skid Row often hosts events that cross neighborhood borders. In 2019, a performance group called the Los Angeles Poverty Department began providing artistic resources to Skid Row, primarily in the form of theater classes and performances. Los Angeles Times journalist Margaret Gray claimed that audience members "somehow felt like part of a family" when the performers were on stage and noted "while many charitable organizations focus on warehousing and policing homeless populations, LAPD attempts to remind them of their unique humanity, to empower them to take collective responsibility for their neighborhood and one another's health and safety". Since 2009 the organization has also sponsored the Festival for All Skid Row Artists.

The "Skid Row City Limits Mural" was created solely by volunteers to express the community's feelings about the history and modern state of the neighborhood. The "Dear Neighbor Mural" is another Skid Row art piece, aimed at making housing a right for all citizens. In addition, Skid Row Karaoke is a long time tradition of residents, which is weekly and open to all.

== Crime ==
Within the LAPD Central Area, which includes Skid Row and other areas in Downtown Los Angeles, crimes showed a 30% decrease year over year in Skid Row after the introduction of the Safer Cities Initiatives in 2006.

Within the first two years of the 2006 implementation of the Safer Cities Initiative in Skid Row, 18,000 arrests were made and 24,000 citations were given for non-violent offenses. This is 69 times the rate of policing in the rest of Los Angeles.

Between July and October 2019, the crime breakdown of 1,007 reported crimes within 0.5 miles of Skid Row's center was 21.97% vehicle break-in/theft, 27.08% larceny, 24.67% assault, 13.14% robbery, 6.12% burglary, 3.11% motor vehicle theft, 2.04% sex crime, 0.8% homicide and 0.7% arson.

== Government and infrastructure ==
The Los Angeles Fire Department (LAFD) serves the neighborhood with Station No. 3 in the Business District, one in the West and Station No. 9 in Skid Row. Station No. 9 operates one engine, one truck, two ALS rescue ambulances, and one BLS rescue ambulance. As of October 2023, it is the busiest firehouse in Los Angeles. Fire engines and ambulances serving the neighborhood have historically had "Skid Row" emblazoned on their sides. On June 1, 2006, the Los Angeles Times reported that fire officials planned to change the legend on the vehicles to read "Central City East". Many residents supported the change, but it was opposed by firefighters and some residents who take pride in the sense that they live in a tough area.

The Los Angeles County Department of Health Services operates the Central Health Center in Downtown Los Angeles, serving Skid Row.

Services for homeless people in Los Angeles are centralized in Skid Row. Examples include the Volunteers of America, the Union Rescue Mission, The Jonah Project, Downtown Mental Health (a branch of the Department of Mental Health), LAMP, Downtown Women's Center, The Weingart Foundation, Los Angeles Mission, Fred Jordan Mission, The Society of St. Vincent de Paul's Cardinal Manning Center, and Midnight Mission. In 2007, Union Rescue Mission opened Hope Gardens, a facility outside of Skid Row which is exclusively for women and children.

=== Transportation ===
The community is served primarily by eight Los Angeles County Metropolitan Transportation Authority bus lines:

==== Local lines ====
- Line 16 – Downtown Los Angeles to Century City (via Fifth and Sixth streets)
- Line 18 – Koreatown to Montebello (via Fifth and Sixth streets)
- Line 20 – Downtown Los Angeles to Westwood (via Seventh Street)
- Line 51 – Carson to Westlake/MacArthur Park (via Seventh and San Pedro streets)
- Line 53 – California State University, Dominguez Hills to Downtown Los Angeles (via Fifth and Sixth streets)
- Line 60 – Artesia Station to Downtown Los Angeles (via Seventh Street)
- Line 62 – Hawaiian Gardens to Downtown Los Angeles (via Fifth and Sixth streets)

==== Rapid lines ====
- Metro Rapid Line 720 – Commerce to Santa Monica (via Fifth and Sixth streets)

== Landmarks ==
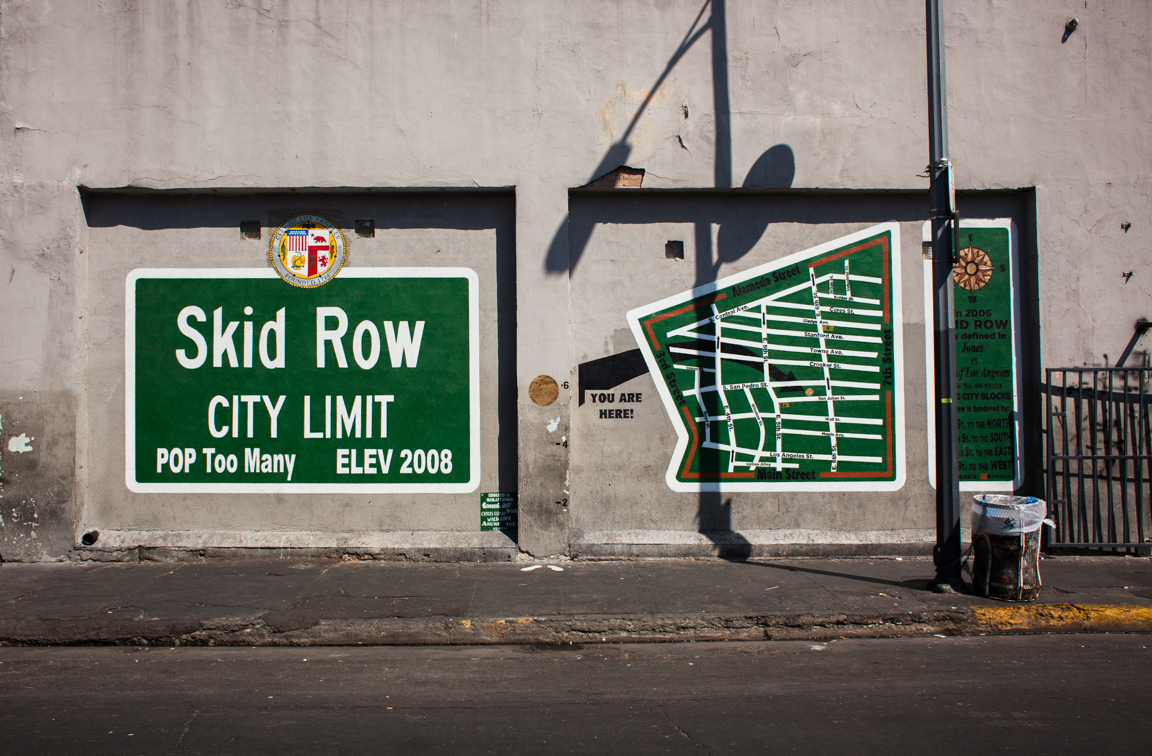
The Skid Row City Limits Mural, 2014

- Star Apartments, a residential housing complex opened in October 2012, built specifically for the needs of the homeless.
- Indian Alley is the unofficial name given to a stretch of alley, in reference to the significance the area held for indigent American Indians from the 1970s to the 1990s. Indian Alley comprises a block of Werdin Place, running south from Winston Street to East 5th Street. It is bounded to the west by Main Street and to the east by Los Angeles Street.
- The Skid Row City Limits Mural is an 18-by-50-foot mural displayed on San Julian Street, created in 2014. It features a map demarcating Skid Row's officially recognized boundaries alongside an official-looking sign, replete with city seal, reading "Skid Row City Limit, Population: Too Many." This is the initial installation of a mural project that is planned to eventually cover the whole wall on the San Julian block north of 6th Street. Installed in compliance with the city's mural ordinance, the project was organized by Skid Row activist General Jeff Page with local street art crew Winston Death Squad, and carried out with the labor of Skid Row citizens. Los Angeles City Councilman Jose Huizar's office has hailed the mural, saying, "It's community pride on the one hand, it's cleverly done and it creates conversation and debate, which often great public art does."

== In popular culture ==
Lost Angels: Skid Row Is My Home, a documentary produced by Agi Orsi, tells the story of eight homeless people, including an Olympic athlete and Harvard graduate, who navigate a world of poverty, drug abuse, and mental illness to build a sense of community. The film examines how the City of Los Angeles criminalizes homelessness by prohibiting Skid Row residents from standing and sitting for a prolonged period of time in a public place.

The site has appeared as a location in several movies, including The Sting, and television shows such as Starsky & Hutch, Baretta, and Quincy, M.E..

The heavy metal band Skid Row is named after the area.

Skid Row was also used as a location for filming the music videos for the Michael Jackson songs "Beat It" and "The Way You Make Me Feel".

Rock band U2 performed "Where the Streets Have No Name" upon a rooftop for the song's music video; the performance referenced the Beatles' final concert, as shown in the film Let It Be.

Electronic musician James Ferraro's 2015 album Skid Row is conceptualized around the area.

Skid Row was also referenced in Little Shop of Horrors, a horror comedy rock musical. The song "Skid Row (Downtown)", describes the living condition of the main character Seymour Krelborn, who is a poor young man, an orphan living in Skid Row. The musical premiered off-off-Broadway in 1982.

A photograph of rock band the Doors, posing behind the lobby window of the Morrison Hotel, was used as the cover for their famous fifth album. The photographer was Henry Diltz.

The neighborhood was also featured as the setting for a multiplayer map in Call of Duty: Modern Warfare 2, which saw Russian ultranationalist Spetsnaz operatives battling U.S. Army Rangers during the former’s invasion of the continental United States.

The neighborhood was featured in the 2026 book Biological War: A Scenario by Annie Jacobsen, which saw the neighborhood hit by a weaponized version of Pneumonic plague.

== Notable residents ==
- Charles Bukowski (1920–1994) – Famous writer spent his youth on Skid Row, where he took inspiration for his books.
- Daveigh Chase (1990–2026) – American actress who spent her last years in Skid Row.
- Danny Harris (b. 1965) – Olympic hurdler and silver medalist. He is currently not living there.
- Nathaniel Ayers (b. 1951) – Juilliard-trained multi-instrumentalist found to have been schizophrenic and homeless, subject of the 2009 movie The Soloist.
- Lil Peep – Born Gustav Elijah Åhr (1996–2017), rapper and singer, lived in Skid Row for a period.

== See also ==
- Deinstitutionalisation
- Los Angeles Community Action Network
- Los Angeles Poverty Department
- Weingart Center for the Homeless
