= Midnight Mission =

Nonprofit organization in Los Angeles, California

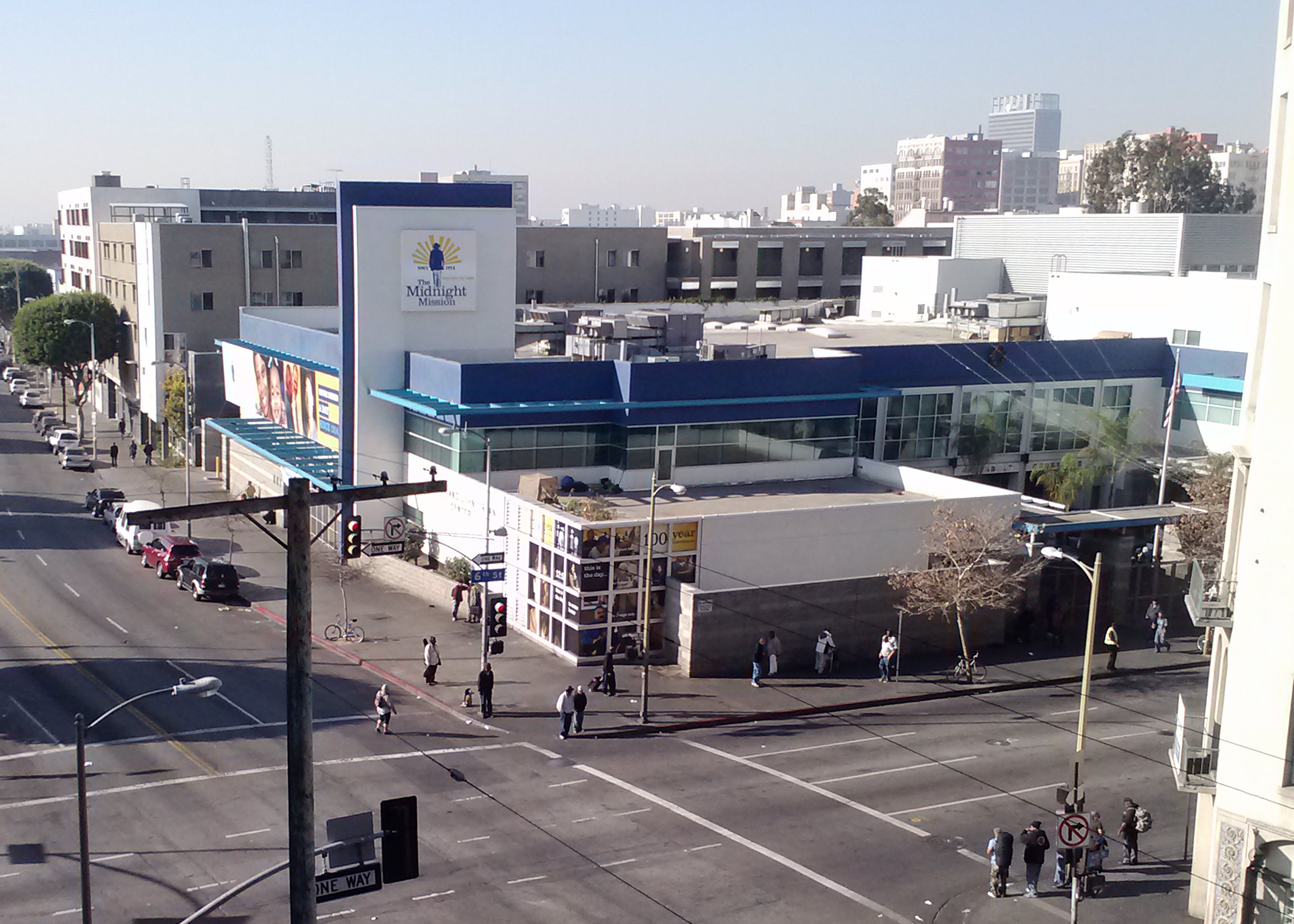
A view of the Midnight Mission

The Midnight Mission is a human services organization in the Skid Row area of downtown Los Angeles. It was founded in 1914. A secular non-profit, the organization provides food, drug and alcohol recovery services, "safe sleep" programs, educational training, a mobile kitchen, and family housing with an emphasis on developing self-sufficiency.

== Background ==
The term "midnight mission" was common in the 19th and early 20th centuries to designate efforts by domestic missionaries in the United States against so-called "white slavery", a deprecated term for prostitution.

== History ==
The Midnight Mission was founded by businessman and lay minister Tom Liddecoat in 1914. Meals were served at midnight, after church services.

In its early years (at least by 1920), the Mission was holding nightly religious services. The Mission became an incorporated non-profit in 1922.

During the Great Depression, the Midnight Mission was a major residence in Los Angeles for people who lacked permanent housing.

During World War II, the Mission began assisting with job placement and established job training programs.
