= Ben Weingart =

American real estate investor (1888–1980)

- Born: Ben Weingart; September 26, 1888; Louisville, Kentucky
- Died: December 22, 1980 (aged 92); Los Angeles, California
- Occupations: Investor, real estate developer, inventor, and philanthropist
- Known for: Development of Lakewood, CA; Aetna Construction, Inc. Tragniew
- Spouse: Stella Shobe (m. 1917)

Ben Weingart (1888–1980) was an American real estate investor and developer, influential in the development of various areas of southern California, including Lakewood, California. A self-made man, Weingart became one of the richest men in California, building a fortune of nearly $100 million, and the Weingart Foundation, his philanthropic organization, has provided grants and support to many charitable causes, having granted more than $950 million in support of various Southern California social services, educational and community programs.

== Early life ==
Ben Weingart was born Benjamin Weingarten, on September 26, 1888, in Louisville, Kentucky. At age four, Ben's German-born father died from tuberculosis, and his Russian mother passed shortly afterwards, leaving him and his two brothers orphans.

Along with his brothers Harry and Max, he was raised at the Hebrew Orphans Asylum in Atlanta, Georgia until being adopted by a Christian Scientist sharecropper outside of Atlanta, near Tignall. Weingart converted to Christian Science as a child, although he supported many Jewish causes later in his life.

== Career ==
Weingart traveled the country with a grifter named Lieber who Weingart described as a "phony doctor." The duo teamed up to sell magnifying lenses as eyeglasses in small towns throughout the west. Weingart moved to Los Angeles in 1906. Still a teenager, he became a delivery driver for the Diamond Laundry Company. His horse and wagon route took him to various hotels in downtown Los Angeles where one of his clients offered him a job as hotel manager. Weingart came to own the Winchester Hotel in Los Angeles, California and a portfolio of more than 200 other hotels. A self-made businessman, Weingart built a fortune and was a millionaire by his early twenties.

Weingart was also an inventor. He built a robot that could respond to piano chords, and developed a high-speed computing counter, and registered patents for various other inventions, including a vacuum cleaner that could reach under furniture, and a novel design for a toilet paper holder.

In 1949 he partnered with Louis Boyar and Mark Taper to acquire 3500 acres of agricultural land near Long Beach, The group formed the Lakewood Park Company and with financing from Prudential Insurance, built 17,000 affordable homes in the new community of Lakewood, California. The group built the Lakewood Center in 1953, and two years later Lakewood was the largest planned city in the United States. From his office at 1301 Wilshire, at the corner of Witmer, in Downtown Los Angeles, Weingart operated his real estate empire through a corporation called “Tragniew,” (Weingart spelled backwards). Weingart owned or controlled many real estate assets, including Consolidated Hotels Corporation, a holding company that operated several modest hotels on Skid Row in Downtown L.A., as well as many shopping centers, office buildings, and more than two hundred apartment buildings throughout the city.

In 1951, Weingart and his wife Stella set up what is now the Weingart Foundation. According to their website, the foundation has made grants exceeding $1 billion, and their work is aimed at "advancing racial, social and economic justice in Southern California."

== Personal life ==
Ben Weingart met Stella Shobe in Boyle Heights and they were married in Santa Ana on Monday, April 23, 1917, when Ben was 28, and Stella was 35.

Stella Weingart died of acute congestive heart failure on December 29, 1957.

== Later life and death ==
Weingart's health began to decline in the 1970s, and beginning in the late 1970s, his companion, Laura Winston, attracted headlines for challenging the court-ordered conservatorship that placed him under the control of three of his business associates. Winston argued that Weingart was capable of handling his own affairs.

Ben Weingart died at the Good Samaritan Hospital in Downtown Los Angeles on December 22, 1980, aged 92.

After his death, Laura Winston fought a protracted legal battle to win recognition as Weingart's companion and to defend her inheritance rights. Winston died February 3, 2010, aged 85.

== Legacy ==
Several structures and organizations in Los Angeles bear Weingart's name today, including:

- Weingart Stadium
- Weingart Center for the Homeless
