= Mark Taper =

American businessperson

- Born: Sydney Mark Taper; 25 December 1901; Poland
- Died: 15 December 1994 (aged 92); Beverly Hills, California, US
- Resting place: Hillside Memorial Park Cemetery
- Occupations: Businessman, philanthropist
- Spouse(s): Amelia Lewis (–1958); Roberta Gale (1962)
- Children: 3; including Carolyn Mary Kleefeld

Sydney Mark Taper (25 December 1901 – 15 December 1994) was a Polish-born British-American real estate developer, financier and philanthropist in London and Southern California. His 1962 gift to the Los Angeles Music Center resulted in the Mark Taper Forum being named for him in 1967.

== Early and personal life ==
Mark Taper was born on 25 December 1902 in a region of Poland, then part of the Russian Empire to Benjamin Taper, a tailor (b. 1881, Russia, d. 1963, London) and Rebecca (nee Rothfarb, b. 1882, Russia) and raised in England, where he had immigrated with his parents at a young age and would live for 36 years. His family was Jewish.

Taper married Amelia Lewis (1909, London, England – 1958, Los Angeles), the daughter of Louis A. Lewis, a furrier in London, and Florence (nee Hobinstock). She was an illustrator for London Vogue. The couple had three children, born in South London. Lewis died in 1958 of "acute pulmonary edema and congestion due to acute alcohol intoxication" at the family home in Beverly Hills and was buried at Hillside Memorial Park.

In 1962, Taper married actress Roberta Gale (1914-2008); the marriage lasted eight months.

== Career ==
Taper opened five shoe stores in England. In 1926, at the age of 25, he was able to retire. From 1929, he instead began successfully investing and developing innovations in real estate and house building. One of his more famous projects in the 1930s was a prestigious development he created in Brockley, Southeast London, whereby Taper named one street Millmark Road (now Millmark Grove) in honor of his wife, (nicknamed Milly) in a portmanteau with his own name, and another Barrydale (now Barriedale) for his young son, Barry. By the late 1930s, Taper had retired and moved his family to Long Beach, California, becoming an American citizen.

During Southern California's postwar housing boom, Taper founded Biltmore Homes and began building suburban housing for returning soldiers in Long Beach, Norwalk, Compton and Lakewood. In all, he built 35,000 houses for low and middle-income people as part of some of the largest housing projects in the U.S. Taper also founded the First Charter Financial Corporation of Beverly Hills, parent of American Savings and Loan. In 1949, he partnered with Louis Boyar and Ben Weingart to acquire 3500 acres of agricultural land near Long Beach, The group formed the Lakewood Park Company and with financing from Prudential Insurance, built 17,000 affordable homes in the new community of Lakewood, California. The group built the Lakewood Center in 1953, and two years later Lakewood was the largest planned city in the United States.

== Philanthropy ==
Taper financed the first gallery for modern works at the Los Angeles County Museum of Art as a memorial to his wife, Amelia, who died in 1958, and was a major donor to the University of California at Los Angeles.

Mark and Amelia Taper devoted much of their time to transporting hundreds of Catholic and Jewish children out of Nazi Germany. The S. Mark Taper Foundation was established in 1952 as a family foundation, and remains active in philanthropic giving, including funding the S. Mark Taper Foundation Imaging Center at Cedars Sinai Medical Center and the S. Mark Taper Foundation Auditorium at Benaroya Hall in Seattle.

== Death and legacy ==
Taper died suddenly from a heart attack on 15 December 1994 in his Beverly Hills, California, home. He was buried next to his first wife in Hillside Memorial Park Cemetery.

As part of the 2007-2008 renovations, the auditorium of the Mark Taper Forum was named the Amelia Taper Auditorium after a $2 million gift from the S. Mark Taper Foundation.
