= Yitzhak Perlstein =

Israeli architect

- יצחק פרלשטיין
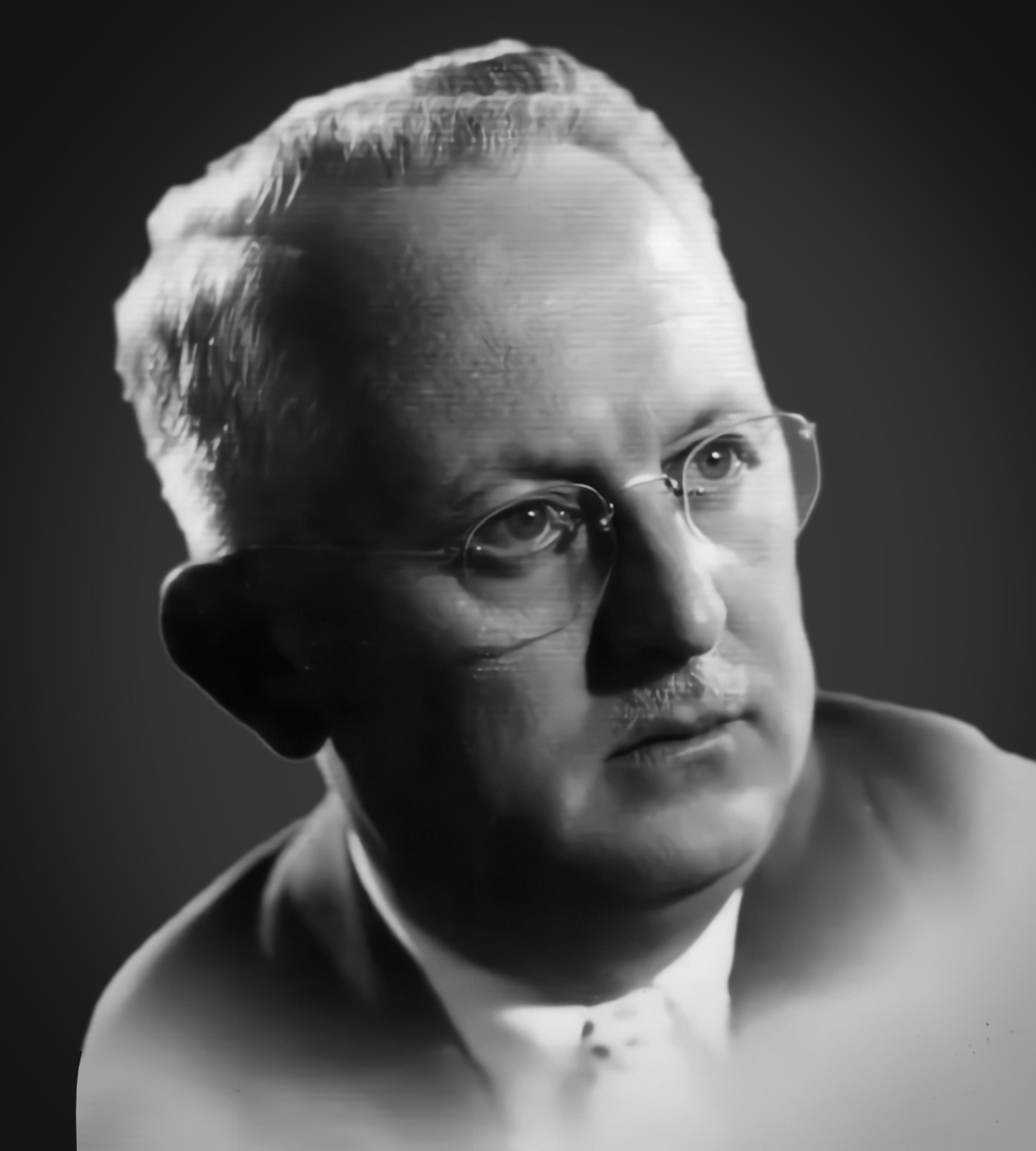
- Born: יצחק פרלשטיין; 23 May 1914; Tel Aviv, Ottoman Empire
- Died: 5 June 1981 (aged 67)
- Resting place: Trumpeldor Cemetery
- Citizenship: Israel
- Occupations: Architect, urban planner
- Awards: Rokach Award (1958); Kaplan Award (1961)

Yitzhak Perlstein (Hebrew: יצחק פרלשטיין; 23 May 1914 – 5 June 1981) was an Israeli architect.

== Biography ==
He was born in Tel Aviv to Pesia and Yaakov Perlstein, who were among the founders of the city. He studied architecture and urban planning at the University of London, receiving his degree in 1937. Upon his return to the country in 1939, he began working primarily in the field of urban development, first within the British Mandate government and later as an independent professional.

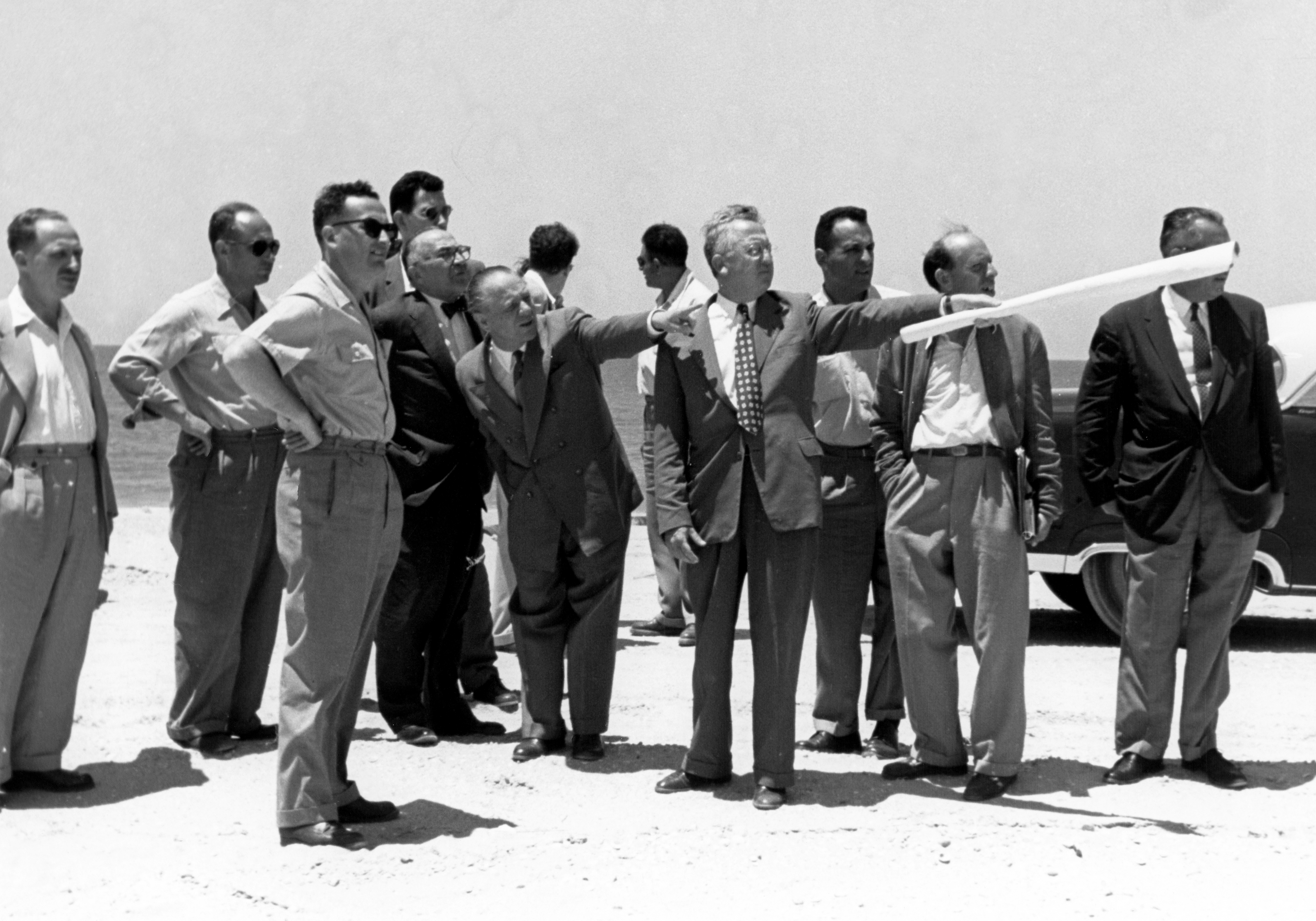
Perlstein and Oved Ben-Ami planning the houses of Ashdod, 1957

In 1958, he was awarded the Rokach Award together with Robert Bennett and Mordechai Ludwig Schorr. In 1961, he received the Kaplan Award for efficiency when he became the first in Israel to use the precast building method, which quickly became widespread and accepted.

Between 1957 and 1959, Dudai worked together with architect Arie Dudai on designing the master plan for the city of Ashdod, commissioned by the Ashdod Company. The plan included 16 residential quarters, each with an area of between 0.5 and 1.2 dunams and a square shape, with each neighborhood comprising about 3,000 to 6,000 housing units for 12,000 to 21,500 people. The plan (D/313 (Note: ד/313)) was officially approved on 6 May 1960, and since then, the city of Ashdod has been built almost precisely according to its defined scale and guidelines.

In 1965, he served as a member of the judging panel for the competition to design the Ashdod city center.

== Personal life ==
Perlstein was the father of Edna, Telma, and Yaakov.

In the 1940s, he married Irene, who was born in the United Kingdom. His sister Rebecca was the wife of entrepreneur and businessman Mordechai Meir, one of the founders of the Shalom Meir Tower in Tel Aviv and Kiryat Wolfson in Jerusalem, both of which Perlstein helped design.

== Gallery ==
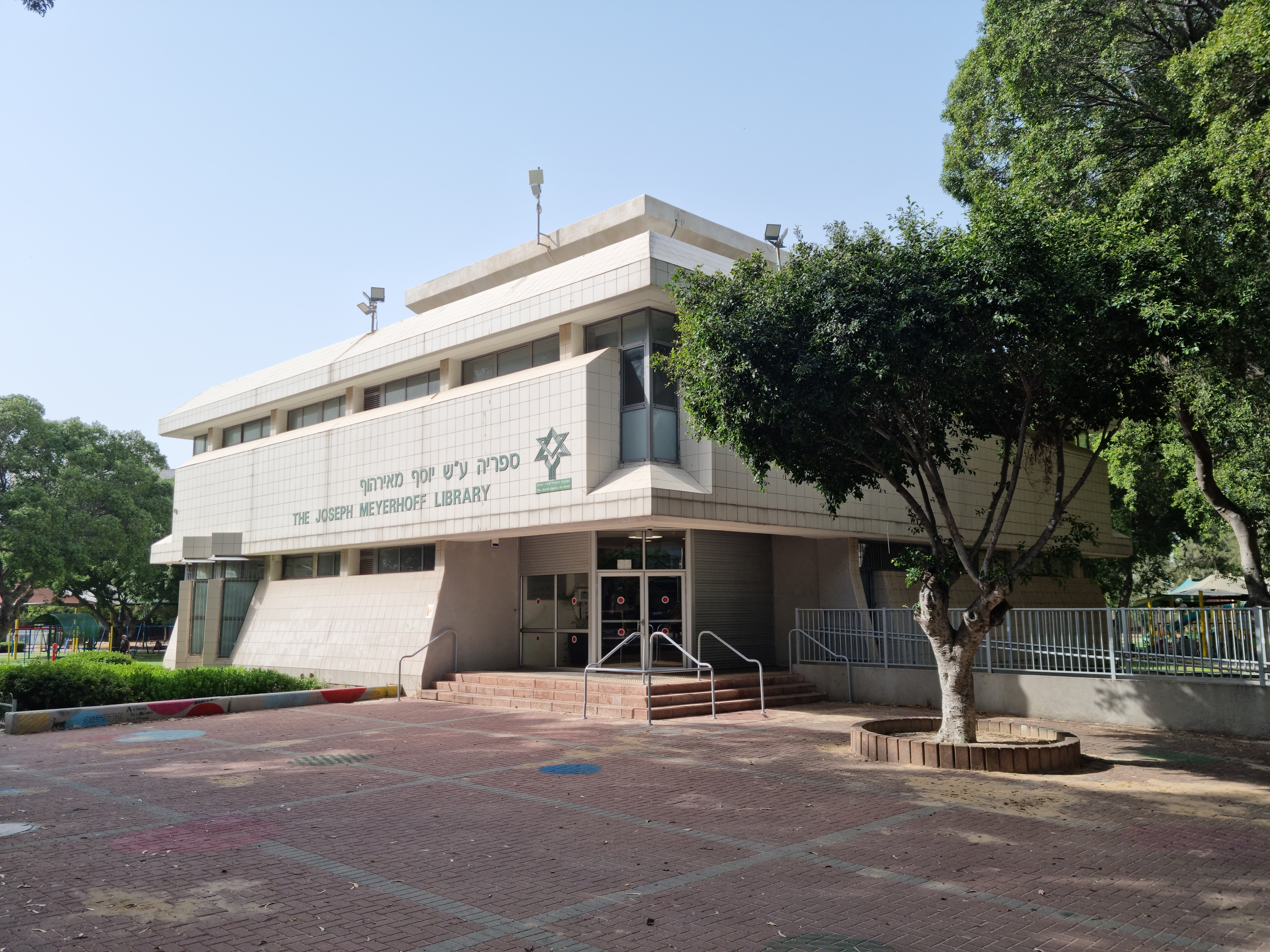
Public library of Ashdod (1971), Ashdod, 2023

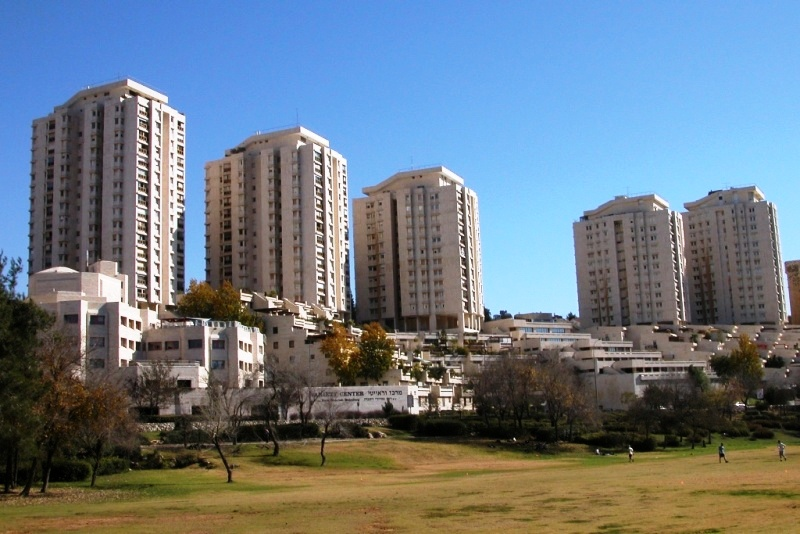
Kiryat Wolfson (1970), Jerusalem, 2005

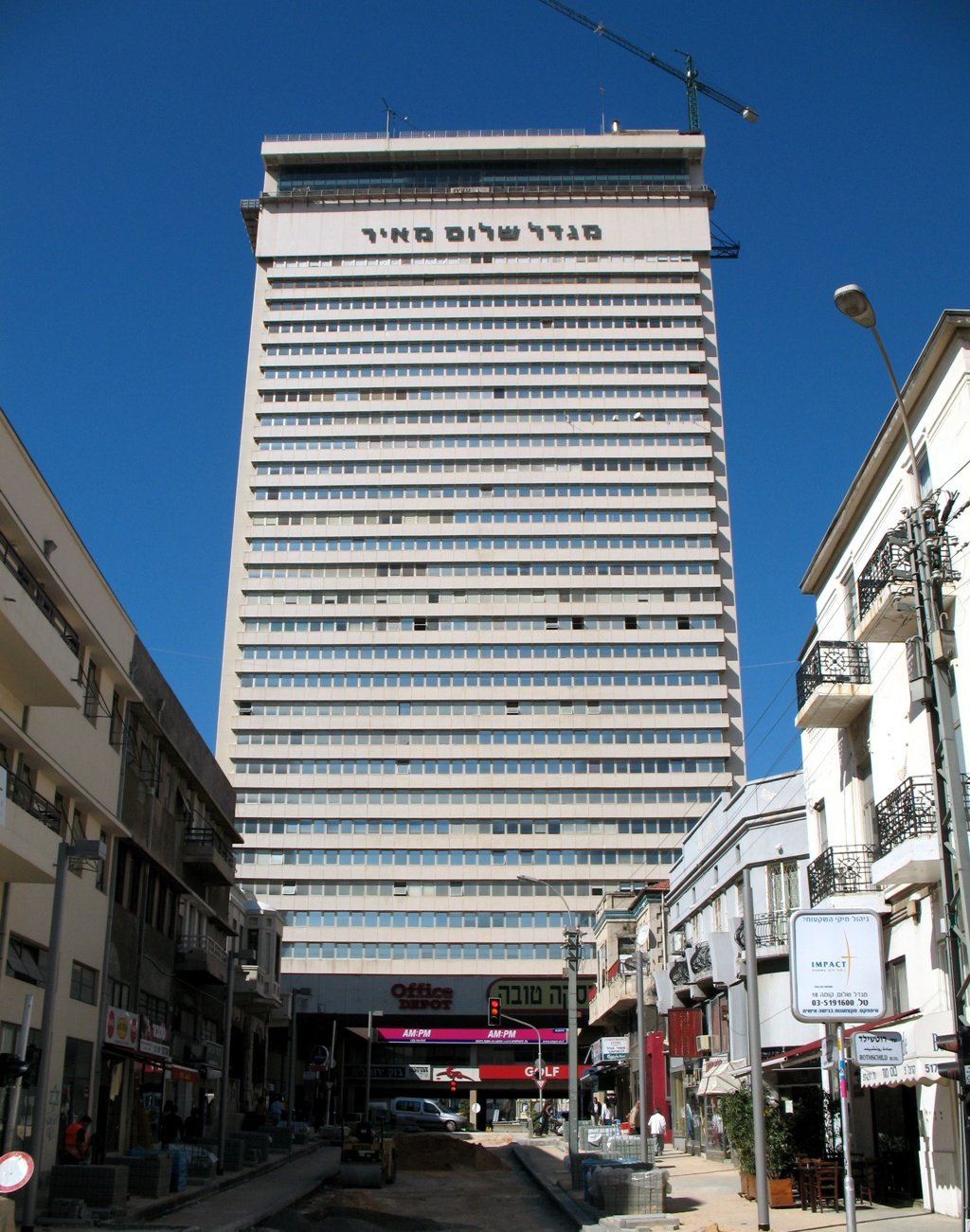
Shalom Meir Tower (1965), Tel Aviv, 2007
