= Weingart Center for the Homeless =

US non-profit organization

Coordinates: 34°2′32″N 118°14′41.8″W

The Weingart Center for the Homeless is a comprehensive human services center for homeless men and women living in Skid Row, Los Angeles. It provides on-site short and long-term services including transitional residential housing, medical and mental health, permanent supportive housing, substance abuse recovery, education, workforce development, long term case management. The Weingart Center is a 501(c)(3) non-profit.

The Weingart Center for the Homeless has five facilities in one block, plus a walk-in access center, totaling 170,000 sq. ft. the Weingart Center serves 6000 homeless people and provides 253,000 meals annually. The Weingart Center is located at 566 South San Pedro Street in the building that was once the El Rey Hotel, designed in 1923 by architect Charles F. Whittlesey.

== History ==
In 1951, Ben and Stella Weingart, who became wealthy from real estate in Los Angeles, started the Weingart Foundation. In 1983, the foundation created the Weingart Center with the donation of a building. In 1997, Weingart Center opened its Access Center, broadening its reach with a wide range of other social services such as HIV and STD testing, veteran services and referrals. In October 2009, Weingart Center opened the Center for Community Health providing health care, dental, optometry and mental health services to low-income and homeless men and women. In July 2010, The Weingart Center Garden Project opened as the first green space in Skid Row.

In 2004, the Weingart Center, along with the Ahmanson Foundation and the Annenberg Foundation founded the Skid Row Homeless Healthcare Initiative (SRHHI). SRHHI had 26 member organizations and hospitals, and ceased operation in 2008.

The "skid row homeless health care initiative" link no longer exists; however, here is some information on how other foundations interested in helping the homeless community have come together to improve the health of skid row homeless residents.

Providing healthcare to homeless people can be challenging given insurance issues, often no primary care provider, or the nature of their residence or lack thereof because care comes in bits from different sources. When services are disjointed there is no collaboration and integration of care. The treatments the homeless patients receive are not coordinated and the patient suffers. To provide adequate and comprehensive care to the homeless that would avoid confusion, some organizations have come together to integrate health services for the homeless.

It is possible that 'skid row homeless health care initiative' as noted above was intended to make such a move towards organizing health care services for the homeless community. For example, the John Wesley Community Health (JWCH) Institute in collaboration with the Los Angeles County Department of Health services (DHS) run the center for community health at the Weingart.

The Community Clinic Association of Los Angeles County has partnered with The Children's Clinic and the Venice Family Clinic to build sustainable clinics that would provide healthcare to the homeless in the county.
