= Kiryat Wolfson =

High-rise apartment complex in Jerusalem, Israel

Coordinates: 31°46′36″N 35°12′36″E

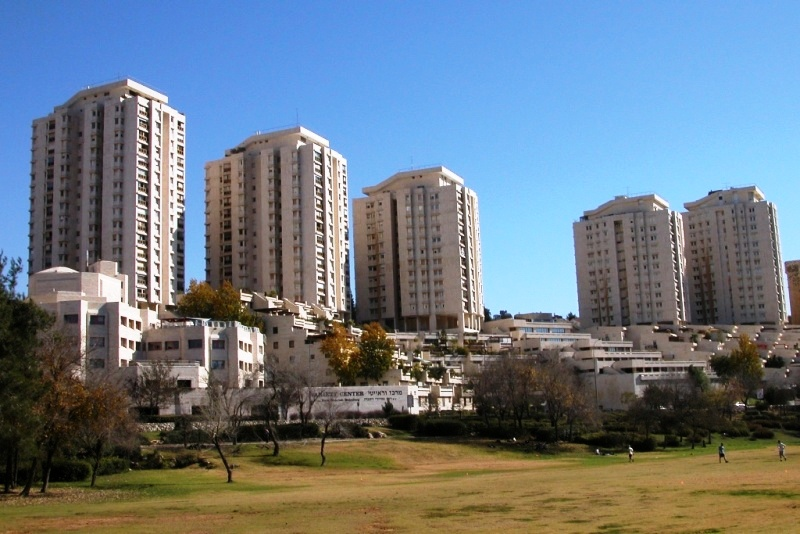
Kiryat Wolfson

Kiryat Wolfson (Hebrew: קריית וולפסון), also known as Wolfson Towers, is a high-rise apartment complex in western Jerusalem. Comprising five towers ranging from 14 to 17 stories above-ground, the project was Jerusalem's first high-rise development. The project encountered opposition from both municipal officials and the public at each stage of its design and construction. The complex includes 10,000 square feet (930 m^{2}) of commercial space and a medical center. The project was financed by the Edith and Isaac Wolfson Trust.

== Location ==
Kiryat Wolfson is situated on a ridge at the western edge of Sha'arei Hesed, northwest of Rehavia. The towers overlook the Valley of the Cross, the Knesset, and the Israel Museum.

== History ==
In the early 1960s, Jerusalem Mayor Mordechai Ish-Shalom sought entrepreneurs to improve Jerusalem's cityscape. He approached Mordechai and Moshe Meir of Israel, business partners with Sir Charles Clore of England and Sir Isaac Wolfson, to invest in the city. With Ish-Shalom's assistance, Mordechai Meir selected a 32 acres (13 ha) plot overlooking the Valley of the Cross for an apartment project. The land was purchased from the Greek Orthodox Patriarchate and the Israel Land Administration for $1.2 million. To overcome the topographical drawbacks of the ridge, the developers applied for taller building rights. To convince the members of the Jerusalem planning committee to agree to the taller-than-normal construction, they hired a world-renowned architect, I. M. Pei, to design it.

In 1967 Pei submitted his design, which called for three towers of 29 stories each. The local planning committee responded with "total opposition", claiming that the towers would "dwarf the Knesset", which faced it across the valley. The committee rejected the design but said it would be prepared to issue permits for towers no higher than 16 stories. Pei refused to downsize the towers and resigned (or was fired) from the project.

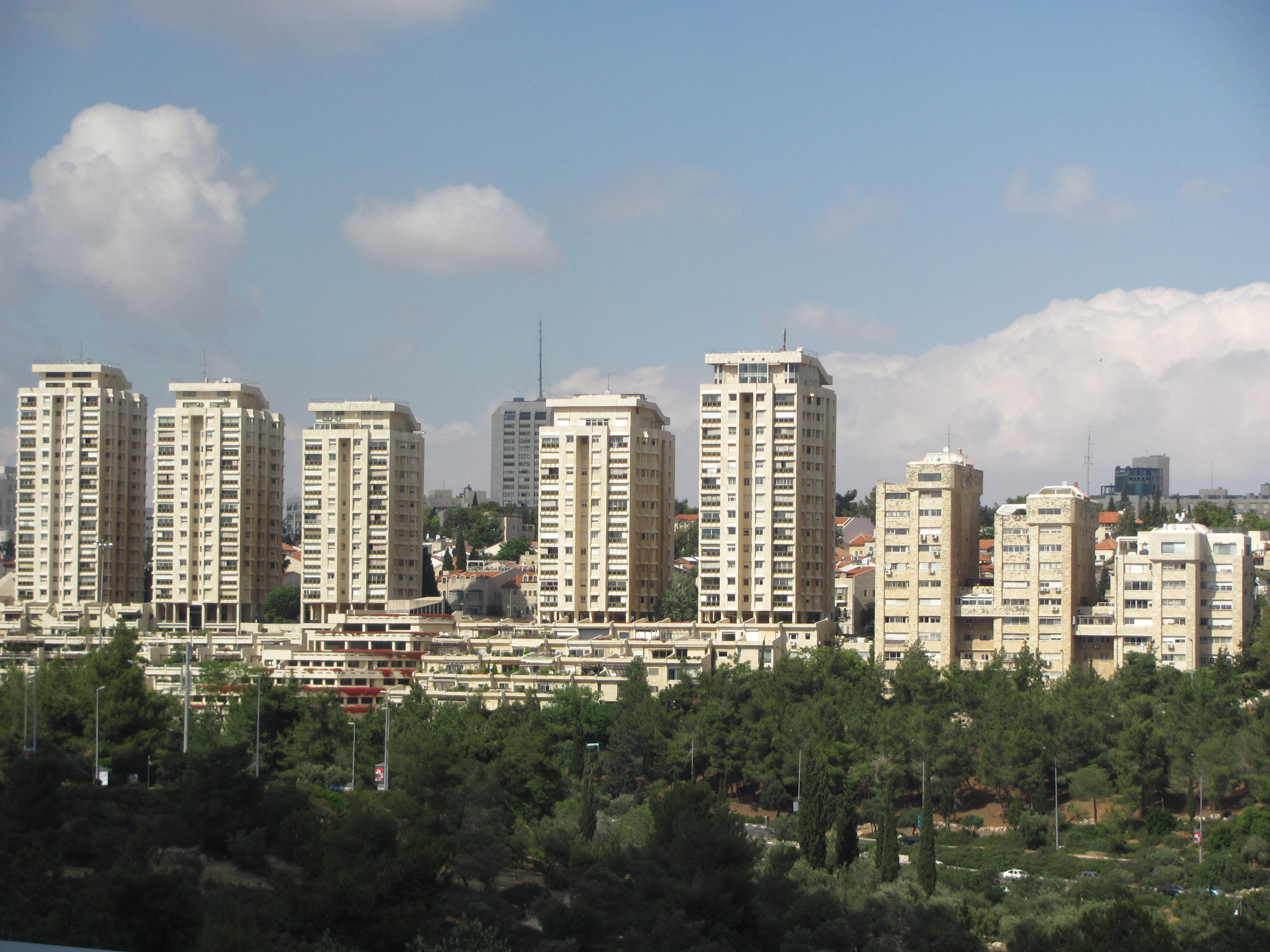
The five towers of Kiryat Wolfson (left), and adjacent high-rises (right), completely obscure the rural neighborhood of Sha'arei Hesed when viewed from the west.

Architect Yitzhak Perlstein, a brother-in-law of Mordechai Meir and architect in Meir's company, was tapped to produce a new design. Perlstein expanded the project to five towers averaging 16 stories each. He added 50 terraced apartments and a shopping center at the base of the buildings to accommodate the topographical contours. The revised plan raised another round of opposition when it was presented to the Jerusalem district planning committee. Kadish Luz, Speaker of the Knesset, claimed that "from the height of the towers, it would be possible to snipe at the Knesset, and even to bomb it". Ish-Shalom persuaded Luz to retract his opposition, and hinted to the committee that a few small apartments could be set aside for committee members if they would approve the five towers, which they did.

The first two towers were constructed between 1970 and 1972. After their completion, a public outcry ensued. Jerusalem Mayor Teddy Kollek appealed to Meir to change the plans for the three remaining towers to a series of low-rise, terraced buildings, but Meir refused. Besides completing the three remaining towers, Meir erected six more high-rises on adjacent land a few years later. The finished towers of Kiryat Wolfson present a 400 metres (1,300 ft) long, 16-story-high "wall" that completely obscures the rural landscape of Sha'arei Hesed when viewed from the west.

== Description ==
Kiryat Wolfson comprises 300 apartments and 50 terraced apartments, or "villas". The units are spacious, ranging from 90 square metres (970 sq ft) for a two-bedroom apartment to 140 square metres (1,500 sq ft) for a four-bedroom unit. Apartments regularly sell for over $1 million. A professional management company oversees the cleanliness and security of the grounds, entrance lobbies, and underground parking areas. The buildings are wheelchair-accessible and have Shabbat elevators.

The 10,000 square feet (930 m^{2}) commercial center located on the lower levels of one of the buildings features a supermarket, retail shops, restaurants, and the Shalom Mayer Medical Center, which includes an English-speaking family clinic and many specialists.

== Demographics ==
Most residents of the Wolfson Towers are foreign retirees. A 2006 Israel Central Bureau of Statistics survey reported that 22.1% of residents of Kiryat Wolfson were aged 70 or older. Kiryat Wolfson consistently logs the highest median age of any Jerusalem neighborhood, religious or secular, in the annual Jerusalem Institute for Israel Studies (JIIS) survey. In 2010 the median age in Kiryat Wolfson was 66, down from 68 in 2009.

Kiryat Wolfson also has the lowest housing density in Jerusalem. A JIIS survey reported a housing density of 71 square metres (760 sq ft) per person in Kiryat Wolfson in 2005, compared to an overall housing density of 19 square metres (200 sq ft) per person in Jerusalem.

== Offices ==
- International Raoul Wallenberg Foundation
- World Jewish Congress Israel

The Embassy of Costa Rica in Israel was located in one of the Wolfson Towers before 1980, and from 1982 to 2006, after which it moved to Tel Aviv.

== Other uses ==
Kiryat Wolfson is the name of an immigrant housing project in Acre, Israel, financed by the Edith and Isaac Wolfson Trust and inaugurated in 1966.
