= Louis H. Boyar =

American philanthropist (1898–1976)

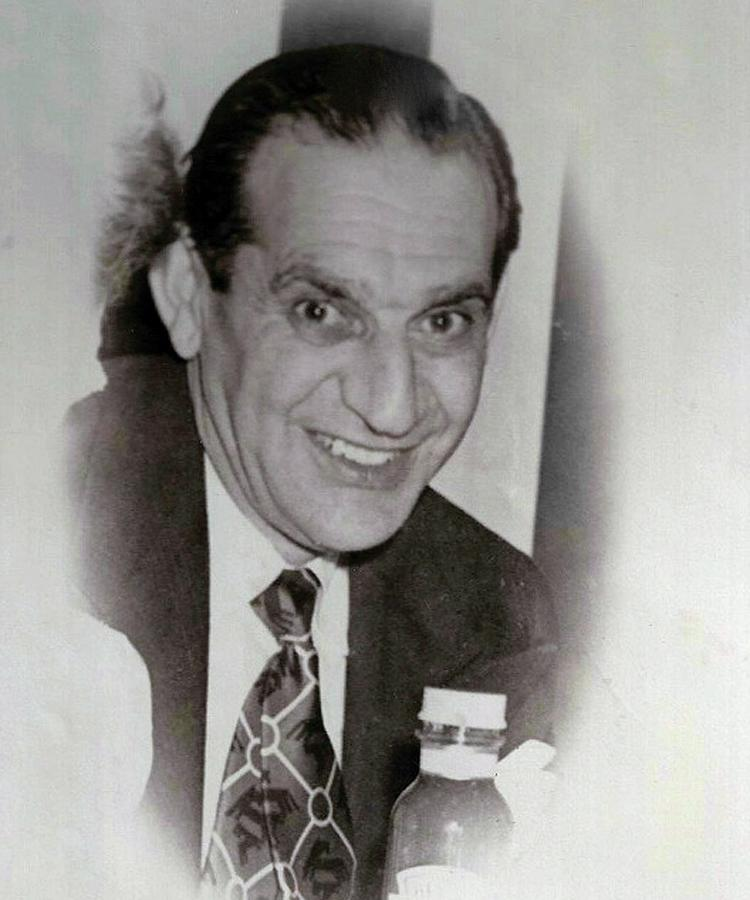
- Born: January 10, 1898; San Francisco, California, U.S.
- Died: December 12, 1976 (aged 78); Los Angeles, California, U.S.
- Resting place: Hillside Memorial Park Cemetery
- Occupation: Real-estate developer

Louis “Lou” H. Boyar (10 January 1898 - 12 December 1976) was an American philanthropist, real-estate developer and pioneer of suburban community planning, a Zionist and a leader of the Jewish community in Greater Los Angeles. He was active in fundraising for the State of Israel, a co-founder of Israel Bonds, a supporter of the Hebrew University of Jerusalem, and founder of “Mae Boyar High School” in Jerusalem.

== Early life ==
Louis Boyar was born in 1898 in San Francisco, California, to Elye-Peretz Boyarsky (1866–1916), a Yiddish writer and newspaper editor, and Pauline Perl Boyarsky (née Hershkovitz, born 1872). He was the eldest of nine children, and had a rigorous Jewish religious upbringing.

His father, Rabbi Elye-Peretz Boyarsky, was born in Grodno, Belarus into a prominent rabbinical family, a descendant of Rabbi Tanhum, who was a disciple of the Vilna Gaon. Elye-Peretz worked for the Yiddish newspaper “Yidishes Tageblat”, spent several years in California, and in 1913 moved to Chicago, where he became editor of the “Yidisher Kuryer.”

In 1934, Louis Boyar settled in Los Angeles with his family, where he started his business ventures.

== Business Career ==
In 1939, Boyar began working in community development and real estate in Los Angeles, initially through a modest loan. Soon he conceived the idea of building the first “planned city” of its kind: Lakewood, California. Together with partners, including hotelier Ben Weingart and financier Mark Taper, he headed the company “Lakewood Park Corporation” that developed the city. The project was designed to meet the needs of GI’s and suited the unique financial opportunity created by the introduction of new government loan regulations, and was based on accessibility principles, where no home would be more than 15 minutes away from city center, and all would be affordable to military veterans.

Lakewood was built between 1950 and 1954, and initially included 17,150 homes on 3,500 acres, eventually totaling over 25,000 homes. The homes were built modularly, on lots of 850-1,200 sq. ft. and were sold at an accessible price (ranging between US$9,400 and US$14,000, as of 1954). The plan included underground electric grid, and public amenities including schools, parks, churches, and shopping centers.

Within one month, over 1,000 houses were sold, and within ten months, an additional 7,200. Most of the buyers were young discharged soldiers who made use of the government loans (from the GI Bill). The community largely comprised workers from the defense and aerospace industries, and was considered a model case of the rise of the American middle class. Life Magazine used Lakewood’s growth on its cover in 1953 showing a "typical" move-in day with moving vans lining every driveway, symbolizing the massive postwar suburban boom and the birth of Lakewood as a symbol of the American dream, a scene created by the Lakewood Park publicist to generate excitement for the new development. The photo, taken by Life’ Magazine photographer J. R. Eyerman, became known as “Typical Move-In Day in Lakewood, California 1953”.

Lakewood’s industrial suburban planning model became a paradigm in urban planning and architecture, studied at universities and featured in the literature, and known as the “Boyar Plan”.

Later Boyar founded another company, Metropolitan Development Corporation (MDC), which purchased more land and developed additional neighborhoods and parks in Southern California, such as Oak Park and other regions in the San Fernando Valley (Valley Park, Valley Park Hills, and the Fallbrook Center shopping center (originally “Fallbrook Square”). Some of these were named after Boyar or his wife Mae.

== Public and Political Life ==
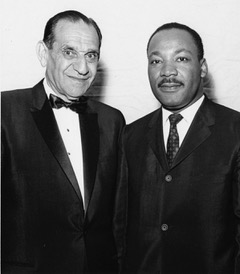
Lou Boyar and Martin Luther King Jr.

Boyar was a fervent Zionist and a major donor to Israel. In the 1940s he was active in the lobby for international recognition of Israel and was credited for being one of the Jewish leaders who made an appeal to the then-US President, Harry S. Truman, to support Israel’s establishment. Later he obtained Truman’s approval for founding an institute bearing his name at the Hebrew University of Jerusalem. Boyar was active in the American Democratic Party and hosted the Democratic National Convention (the DNC) in Los Angeles in 1964. Boyar maintained extensive connections with leaders of the African American community in the United States, including Martin Luther King Jr. and Tom Bradley, who later became the first African American mayor of Los Angeles.

=== Activity for Israel and establishment of Israel Bonds ===
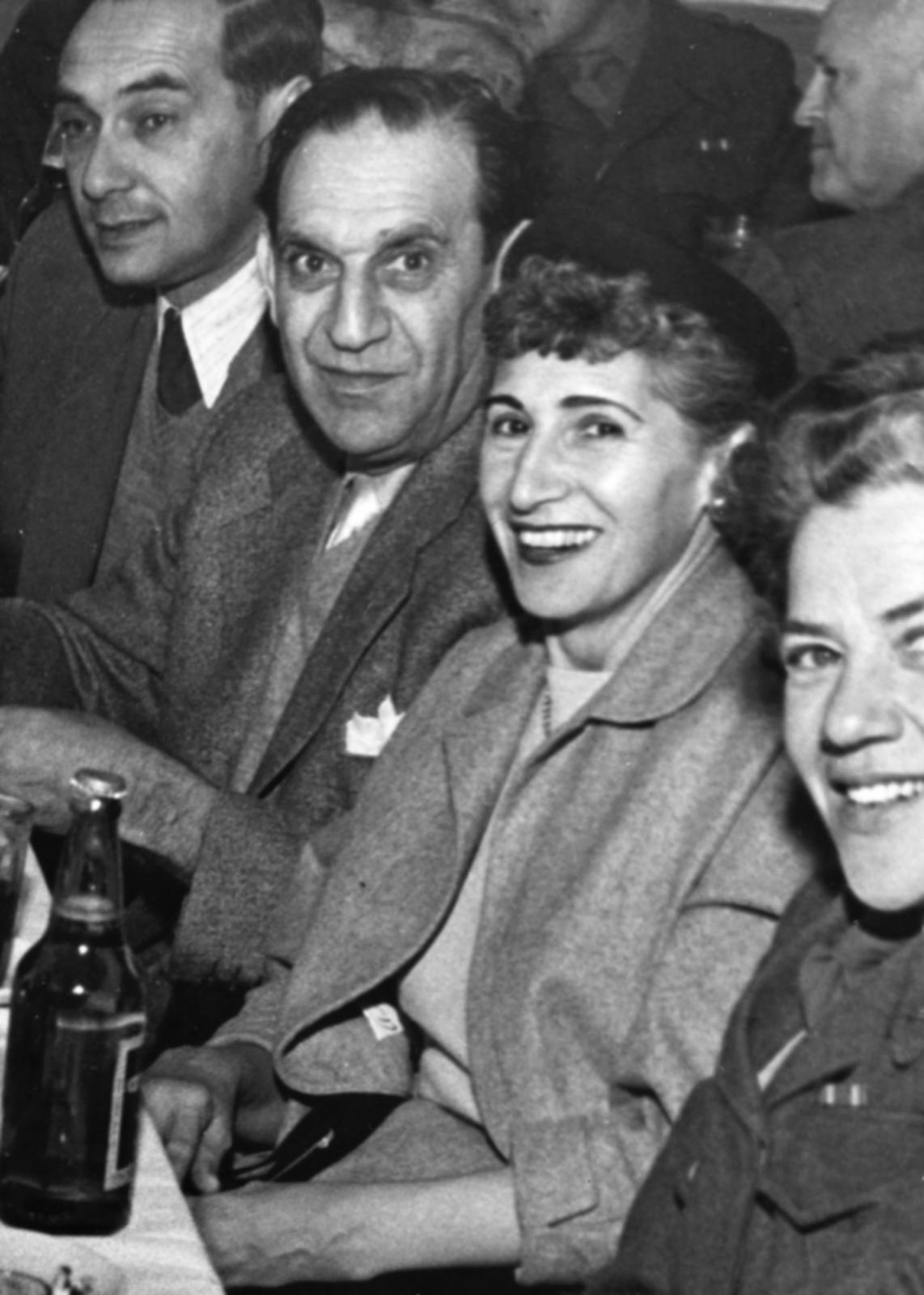
Lou and Mae Boyar

Boyar was a founder of Israel Bonds, at the request of David Ben-Gurion in 1951, and served as its first chairman of the board of trustees. Through this organization, hundreds of millions of dollars were raised from the sale of bonds, mostly to North American Jews, funds that helped build vital infrastructure for the young State of Israel. Boyar was also instrumental sponsoring the national conference of Israel Bonds, held in Los Angeles in 1968, where the guest of honor was then-Israeli Ambassador to the United States and later Prime Minister of Israel, Yitzhak Rabin.

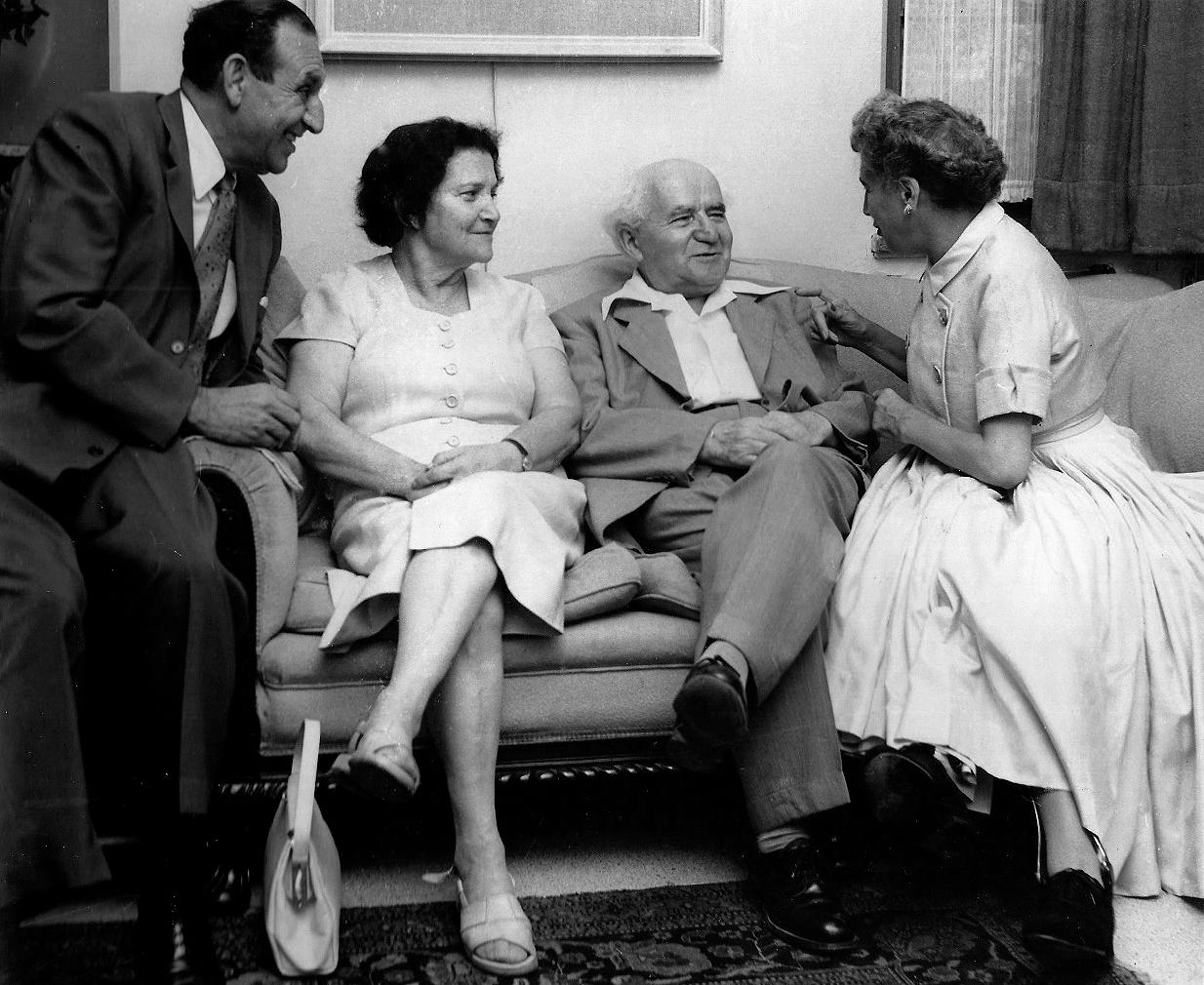
Mae and Lou Boyar, Paula and David Ben-Gurion

Boyar was also a founder of the Company for the Development of the State of Israel (Hebrew: “החברה לפיתוח מדינת ישראל”) and served as its board chairman. He led the investment fund Israel Investors, Inc., and supported the Zionist Organization of America (ZOA).

Boyar was also known for his longstanding close friendship with Israeli Prime Minister Golda Meir. In 1971, rumors of a romantic involvement surfaced, although these were denied by Boyar’s granddaughter, who said that Golda Meir was a close family friend and a regular guest at their Shabbat dinners. After Boyar requested Golda Meir’s help in obtaining a visa to Israel for Jewish organized-crime-figure Meyer Lansky, Boyar became a subject of investigation by the Federal Bureau of Investigation (FBI).

=== Leadership in the American Jewish Community ===
Boyar held key positions in various welfare and community organizations among American Jews. He served as chairman of the welfare foundation of Los Angeles Jews, and as vice-chair of the Jewish Chamber of Commerce of the United States, among other positions.

=== Support for the Hebrew University of Jerusalem ===
Boyar contributed significantly to the development of the Hebrew University of Jerusalem. He served as vice-president of “Friends of the Hebrew University in the United States” and as a member of the Hebrew University of Jerusalem international board of trustees. He contributed to the development of the Mt. Scopus campus in Jerusalem and chaired its fund-raising campaign for which he received the University’s Honorary Doctorate in 1967, along with then-IDF Chief Major General Yitzhak Rabin. Boyar funded the “Mae Boyar Chemistry Building,” in which the “Florence Goldenberg Dvorsky Hall” was inaugurated through support of the Goldenberg family.

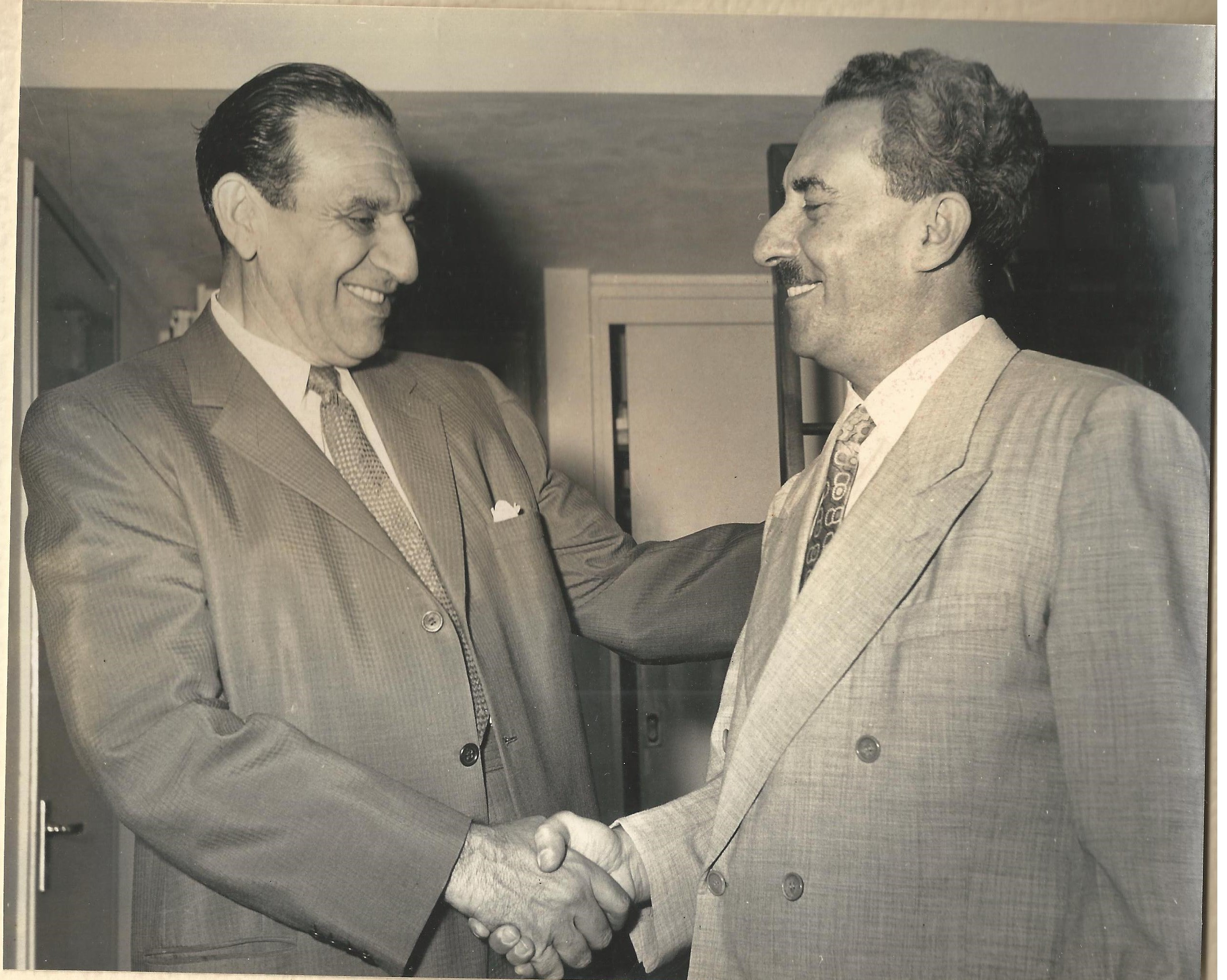
Lou Boyar and Moshe Sharett

Additionally, the “Louis H. Boyar Building” was built on the Mt. Scopus campus. It was inaugurated on June 8, 1998, and serves as part of the Rothberg International School.

=== Establishment of Mae Boyar High School ===
After the death of his wife, Mae Boyar, in 1960, Boyar initiated the founding of the Mae Boyar High School in Jerusalem, a high school and boarding school for gifted students and at-risk youth, with a personal donation of US$1.25 million (equaling approx. US$15 million in 2025). The opening ceremony was attended by several dignitaries: Israeli Prime Minister Levi Eshkol, Israeli Education Minister Zalman Aran, Israeli Foreign Minister Golda Meir, the Mayor of Jerusalem Mordechai Ish-Shalom, the U.S. Ambassador to Israel Walworth Barbour, and the President of the Hebrew University Eliahu Eilat.

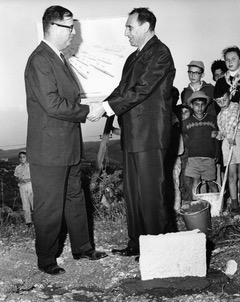
Lou Boyar and Abba Eban

The school was designed to host about 1,000 students, with 200 in dormitories, and included housing for faculty.

== Personal life ==
Louis Boyar was married to Mae Boyar (née Cohen), originally from Chicago, who was a close friend of Golda Meir. The couple had two children: Marshall Boyar (1930–1982) and Pearl Boyar (1932–1982). Their daughter Pearl immigrated to Israel in 1973, and is buried in Kibbutz Gadot. Boyar had 11 grandchildren, among them Karen Kennedy who continued in her grandfather’s footsteps in the field of real-estate management and development, and Julie F. Goodman Aharoni, an educator, who worked for many years at the Mae Boyar High School in Jerusalem.

== Awards ==
Boyar won the Kaplan Award in 1958.

== Death ==
Boyar died of a heart attack on December 12, 1976, during a “Man of Century" dinner held in his honor by Israel Bonds in Los Angeles. He was 78. At the time of his death, he was the chairman of Israel Bonds’ Board of Governors.

He is buried at the Hillside Memorial Park Cemetery in Culver City, California.
