= American Savings and Loan =

Defunct savings and loan association in California

American Savings and Loan Association
- Type: Savings and loan association
- Industry: Financial services
- Founded: 1922 in Stockton, California, United States
- Defunct: September 1988
- Fate: Receivership
- Headquarters: Stockton, California, United States
- Area served: California
- Products: Mortgages

American Savings and Loan Association was an American savings and loan based in Stockton, California. In 1988 it was the largest thrift failure and the federal government's costliest resolution during the savings and loan crisis at an estimated cost of $5.4 billion.

== History ==
The thrift was founded in 1922 as State Savings & Loan Association in Stockton. It was owned by Irvine, California based Financial Corporation of America (FCA). The thrift experienced rapid growth in the 1970s and early 1980s. In 1983, it acquired First Charter Financial Corporation in Los Angeles for $700 million. First Charter was the parent company of American Savings & Loan, and was controlled by real estate developer Mark Taper. State Savings changed its name to American Savings after the acquisition. In 1984, the thrift suffered a run of nearly $7 billion on its deposits after posting a $1.1 billion loss on bad investments and real estate loans. Chairman Charles W. Knapp and president J. Foster Fluetsch were forced out of the thrift by regulators in August 1984 and Bill Popejoy took over as chairman. However, the condition of the thrift continued to deteriorate. The thrift had large holdings of mortgage-backed securities, which were subject to price volatility as interest rates changed.

A $468 million loss in 1987 left the thrift technically insolvent. American Savings was placed in receivership in September 1988. FCA filed for chapter 11 bankruptcy the next day. (In February 1989, it was changed to a chapter 7 liquidation.) The thrift was split into a good bank and bad bank, with New West Federal Savings bank as the bad bank. At the time it had $30 billion in assets and was one of the largest thrifts in the United States.

The Robert M. Bass Group, Inc. of Fort Worth, headed by Robert Bass, acquired American Savings in December 1988 in a controversial deal with the federal government. They invested $500 million total over three years, and the federal governments contributed $1.7 billion. The thrift was then renamed American Savings Bank, F.A. The thrift purchased deposits and branches of Columbia Savings and Loan in 1991, Far West Savings and Loan in 1992, Valley Federal S&L in 1992, and Encino Savings Bank in 1994. In 1996, American Savings Bank was purchased by Washington Mutual Bank for $1.2 billion. Washington Mutual failed in 2008 and was acquired by JP Morgan Chase Bank.

Charles Knapp was convicted in 1993 of fraud, although it was not related to American Savings. His company, Trafalgar Holdings Ltd., obtained a $15 million loan from Western Savings and Loan in Phoenix, Arizona, using fraudulent financial information. He was sentenced to 6 1/2 years in prison.
