= Lakewood, California =

City in California, United States

- City
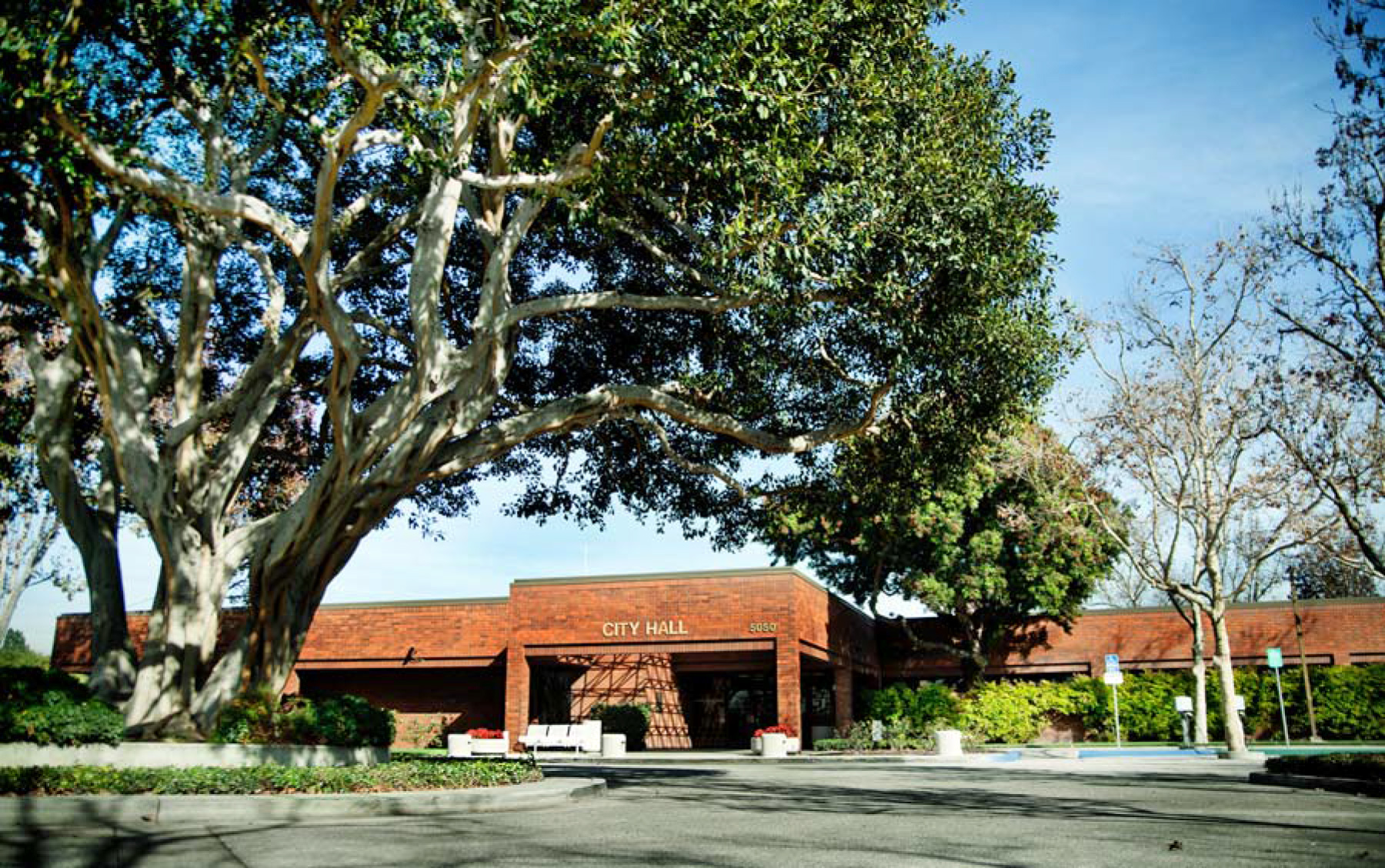
- Lakewood City Hall

- Seal
- Motto(s): "Times change, values don't"
- Interactive map of Lakewood, California
- Location in the United States
- Coordinates: 33°50′51″N 118°7′12″W
- Country: United States
- State: California
- County: Los Angeles
- Incorporated: April 16, 1954

Government
  - Mayor: Cassandra Chase
  - Vice Mayor: Jeff Wood
  - City Council: David Arellano; Steve Croft; Todd Rogers

Area
  - Total: 9.45 sq mi (24.48 km^{2})
  - Land: 9.40 sq mi (24.35 km^{2})
  - Water: 0.050 sq mi (0.13 km^{2}) 0.54%
- Elevation: 46 ft (14 m)

Population (2020)
  - Total: 82,496
  - Density: 8,775/sq mi (3,388/km^{2})
- Time zone: UTC−8 (Pacific)
  - Summer (DST): UTC−7 (PDT)
- ZIP Codes: 90711–90716, 90805
- Area code: 562
- FIPS code: 06-39892
- GNIS feature IDs: 1660883, 2411613
- Website: www.lakewoodca.gov

Lakewood is a suburban city in Los Angeles County, California, United States. The population was 82,496 at the 2020 census. It is bordered by Long Beach on the west, northwest and south, Bellflower on the north, Cerritos on the northeast, Cypress on the east, and Hawaiian Gardens on the southeast. Major thoroughfares include Lakewood (SR 19), Bellflower, and Del Amo Boulevards and Carson and South Streets. The San Gabriel River Freeway (I-605) runs through the city's eastern regions.

== History ==
Lakewood is a post-World War II planned community. Developers Louis Boyar, Mark Taper and Ben Weingart are credited with "altering forever the map of Southern California." Begun in late 1949, the completion of the developers' plan in 1953 helped in the transformation of mass-produced housing from its early phases in the 1930s and 1940s to the reality of the postwar 1950s.

WWII veterans were offered home loans with no down payment and a 30-year mortgage at only 4 percent interest. On the first day of sales, March 24, 1950, an estimated 30,000 people lined up to walk through a row of seven model houses. By the end of April, more than 200,000 people had flocked to the Lakewood Park sales office and more than 1,000 families had purchased homes (30 per day on average). On one occasion, 107 homes were sold in just one hour. The monthly cost was $44 to $56, including principal, interest and insurance.

The building of Lakewood broke records. Empty fields became 17,500 houses in less than three years. A new house was completed every 7 1/2 minutes, 40 to 60 houses per day, with a record 110 completed in a single day.

Lakewood's primary thoroughfares are mostly boulevards with landscaped medians, with frontage roads on either side in residential districts. Unlike in most similar configurations, however, access to the main road from the frontage road is only possible from infrequently spaced collector streets. This arrangement, hailed by urban planners of the day, is a compromise between the traditional urban grid and the arrangement of winding "drives" and cul-de-sac that dominates contemporary suburban and exurban design.

As the unincorporated Lakewood grew to a community of more than 70,000 residents, so grew its municipal needs. Lakewood in 1953 had three choices: be annexed to nearby Long Beach, remain unincorporated and continue to receive county services, or incorporate as a city under a novel plan that continued county services under contract. In 1954, residents in the northern and eastern sections chose the latter option and voted to incorporate as a city, the largest community in the country ever to do so and the first city in Los Angeles County to incorporate since 1939. The portion of Lakewood that was annexed to Long Beach is now known as Lakewood Village.

Lakewood is credited as a pioneer among California cities in service provision. Although it is an incorporated city, Lakewood still contracts for most municipal services, with most of these provided by Los Angeles County and, to a lesser extent, by other public agencies and private industry. Lakewood was the first city in the nation to contract for all of its municipal services when it incorporated as a municipality in 1954, making it the nation's first "contract city." Many other Los Angeles suburbs, such as Cerritos, Bellflower, Walnut, and Diamond Bar, have adopted the so-called "Lakewood Plan." About half the cities in Los Angeles County contract for law enforcement from Los Angeles County through the County Sheriff's Department.

== Geography ==
According to the United States Census Bureau, the city has a total area of 9.5 square miles (24.5 km^{2}), of which 9.4 square miles (24.3 km^{2}) is land and 0.050 square miles (0.13 km^{2}) (0.54%) is water.

== Demographics ==
Historical population
| Census | Pop. | Note | %± |
|---|---|---|---|
| 1960 | 67,126 | | — |
| 1970 | 83,025 | | 23.7% |
| 1980 | 74,511 | | −10.3% |
| 1990 | 73,557 | | −1.3% |
| 2000 | 79,345 | | 7.9% |
| 2010 | 80,048 | | 0.9% |
| 2020 | 82,496 | | 3.1% |
U.S. Decennial Census; 1860–1870 1880-1890; 1900 1910 1920; 1930 1940 1950; 1960 1970 1980; 1990 2000 2010; 2020

Lakewood first appeared as a city in the 1960 U.S. census as part of the Lakewood-Long Beach census county division.

=== Racial and ethnic composition ===
Lakewood city, California – Racial and ethnic composition Note: the US Census treats Hispanic/Latino as an ethnic category. This table excludes Latinos from the racial categories and assigns them to a separate category. Hispanics/Latinos may be of any race.
| Race / Ethnicity (NH = Non-Hispanic) | Pop 1980 | Pop 1990 | Pop 2000 | Pop 2010 | Pop 2020 | % 1980 | % 1990 | % 2000 | % 2010 | % 2020 |
|---|---|---|---|---|---|---|---|---|---|---|
| White alone (NH) | 61,124 | 53,176 | 41,577 | 32,774 | 25,882 | 81.88% | 72.29% | 52.40% | 40.94% | 31.37% |
| Black or African American alone (NH) | 1,499 | 2,586 | 5,663 | 6,663 | 6,530 | 2.01% | 3.52% | 7.14% | 8.32% | 7.92% |
| Native American or Alaska Native alone (NH) | 808 | 380 | 264 | 234 | 215 | 1.08% | 0.52% | 0.33% | 0.29% | 0.26% |
| Asian alone (NH) | 2,403 | 6,562 | 10,548 | 12,811 | 15,137 | 3.22% | 8.92% | 13.29% | 16.00% | 18.35% |
| Pacific Islander alone (NH) | 2,403 | 6,562 | 446 | 686 | 645 | 3.22% | 8.92% | 0.56% | 0.86% | 0.78% |
| Other Race alone (NH) | 171 | 90 | 174 | 178 | 448 | 0.23% | 0.12% | 0.22% | 0.22% | 0.54% |
| Mixed race or Multiracial (NH) | x | x | 2,602 | 2,601 | 4,157 | x | x | 3.28% | 3.25% | 5.04% |
| Hispanic or Latino (any race) | 8,649 | 10,763 | 18,071 | 24,101 | 29,482 | 11.59% | 14.63% | 22.78% | 30.11% | 35.74% |
| Total | 74,654 | 73,557 | 79,345 | 80,048 | 82,496 | 100.00% | 100.00% | 100.00% | 100.00% | 100.00% |

=== 2020 census ===
As of the 2020 census, Lakewood had a population of 82,496 and a population density of 8,774.3 inhabitants per square mile (3,387.8/km^{2}). The median age was 39.4 years. The age distribution was 21.0% under 18, 9.0% from 18 to 24, 27.6% from 25 to 44, 27.5% from 45 to 64, and 15.0% age 65 or older. For every 100 females, there were 94.3 males, and for every 100 females age 18 and over, there were 91.6 males age 18 and over.

The census reported that 99.7% of the population lived in households, 0.3% lived in non-institutionalized group quarters, and 0.0% were institutionalized. It also reported that 100.0% of residents lived in urban areas and 0.0% lived in rural areas.

There were 27,319 households, of which 36.2% had children under the age of 18 living in them. Of all households, 54.3% were married-couple households, 6.2% were cohabiting couple households, 25.1% had a female householder with no spouse or partner present, and 14.4% had a male householder with no spouse or partner present. About 17.2% of households were one person households and 8.0% were one-person households with someone age 65 or older. The average household size was 3.01, and there were 20,966 families (76.7% of all households).

There were 27,931 housing units, of which 97.8% were occupied and 2.2% were vacant. Of occupied units, 70.7% were owner-occupied and 29.3% were renter-occupied. The homeowner vacancy rate was 0.4%, and the rental vacancy rate was 2.7%.

=== 2023 ACS estimates ===
In 2023, the US Census Bureau estimated that the median household income was $116,794, and the per capita income was $44,444. About 4.0% of families and 5.9% of the population were below the poverty line.

=== 2010 census ===
At the 2010 census Lakewood had a population of 80,048. The population density was 8,456.4 inhabitants per square mile (3,265.0/km^{2}). The racial makeup of Lakewood was 44,820 (56.0%) White (40.9% Non-Hispanic White), 6,973 (8.7%) African American, 564 (0.7%) Native American, 13,115 (16.4%) Asian (8.1% Filipino, 1.5% Korean, 1.4% Chinese, 1.4% Cambodian, 1.2% Vietnamese, 0.7% Japanese, 0.6% Indian, 0.4% Thai), 744 (0.9%) Pacific Islander, 9,249 (11.6%) from other races, and 4,583 (5.7%) from two or more races. In addition, there were 24,101 (30.1%) Hispanic or Latino residents of any race; 24.1% of Lakewood's population was of Mexican ancestry.

The census reported that 79,939 people (99.9% of the population) lived in households, 109 (0.1%) lived in non-institutionalized group quarters, and no one was institutionalized.

There were 26,543 households, 10,649 (40.1%) had children under the age of 18 living in them, 14,711 (55.4%) were opposite-sex married couples living together, 3,975 (15.0%) had a female householder with no husband present, 1,696 (6.4%) had a male householder with no wife present. There were 1,262 (4.8%) unmarried opposite-sex partnerships, and 283 (1.1%) same-sex married couples or partnerships. 4,719 households (17.8%) were one person and 1,965 (7.4%) had someone living alone who was 65 or older. The average household size was 3.01. There were 20,382 families (76.8% of households); the average family size was 3.41.

The age distribution was 19,476 people (24.3%) under the age of 18, 7,593 people (9.5%) aged 18 to 24, 22,117 people (27.6%) aged 25 to 44, 21,776 people (27.2%) aged 45 to 64, and 9,086 people (11.4%) who were 65 or older. The median age was 37.5 years. For every 100 females, there were 94.3 males. For every 100 females age 18 and over, there were 90.8 males.

There were 27,470 housing units at an average density of 2,902.0 per square mile, of the occupied units 19,131 (72.1%) were owner-occupied and 7,412 (27.9%) were rented. The homeowner vacancy rate was 1.1%; the rental vacancy rate was 5.7%. 57,591 people (71.9% of the population) lived in owner-occupied housing units and 22,348 people (27.9%) lived in rental housing units.

=== 2009–2013 estimates ===
During 2009–2013, Lakewood had a median household income of $77,786, with 8.1% of the population living below the federal poverty line.

=== 2000 census ===
According to Mapping L.A., Mexican and German were the most common ancestries. Mexico and the Philippines were the most common foreign places of birth in 2000.

== Economy ==
The Lakewood Center shopping mall opened in 1951.

=== Top employers ===
According to the city's 2014-2015 Comprehensive Annual Financial Report, the top employers in the city are:

| # | Employer | # of Employees | Total employment |
|---|---|---|---|
| 1 | Long Beach Unified School District | 909 | 5.35% |
| 2 | UCI Health - Lakewood | 791 | 4.65% |
| 3 | City of Lakewood | 594 | 3.49% |
| 4 | Los Angeles County Department of Children and Family Services | 435 | 2.56% |
| 5 | Bellflower Unified School District | 402 | 2.36% |
| 6 | Walmart | 349 | 2.05% |
| 7 | Los Angeles County Sheriff's Department | 321 | 1.89% |
| 8 | ABC Unified School District | 320 | 1.88% |
| 9 | The Home Depot | 302 | 1.78% |
| 10 | Albertsons | 287 | 1.69% |

=== Retailers ===
- Allen Tire Company (1973)

== Arts and culture ==
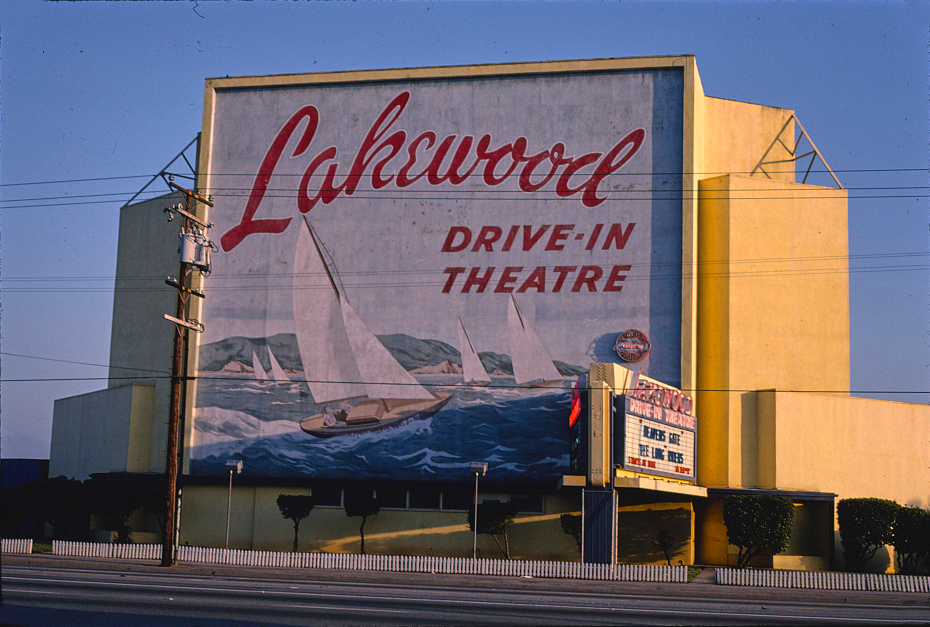
Lakewood Drive-In Theater, 1981. Photo by John Margolies.

Lakewood is served by two County Of Los Angeles Public Libraries: the George Nye, Jr. Library, and the Angelo M. Iacoboni Library. Iacoboni Library, named after the city's first mayor, opened in 1954. In 1959 it shifted to another building, and it received its current name in 1965, before, in 1973, moving to its current facility. Nye, located in the east of the city and named after another mayor, George H. Nye, Jr. (died May 1971), opened on February 22, 1973.

== Government ==
A five-member city council governs Lakewood. The mayor is appointed annually by the council from among its members. The city attorney and city manager are also appointed by the council.

In the California State Senate, Lakewood is in the 33rd senatorial district, represented by Democrat Lena Gonzalez. In the California State Assembly, it is in the 62nd Assembly district, represented by Democrat Jose Solache.

In the United States House of Representatives, Lakewood is divided among the 42nd, 44th and 45th congressional districts which are represented by Robert Garcia (D–Long Beach), Nanette Barragán (D–Los Angeles) and Derek Tran (D–Orange) respectively.

== Education ==
In the early 1990s, a coalition of Lakewood residents formed the Lakewood Unified School District Organizing Committee, which sought to establish a separate Lakewood school district. The organizing committee became the Lakewood Education Foundation, which raises funds to assist classroom teachers.

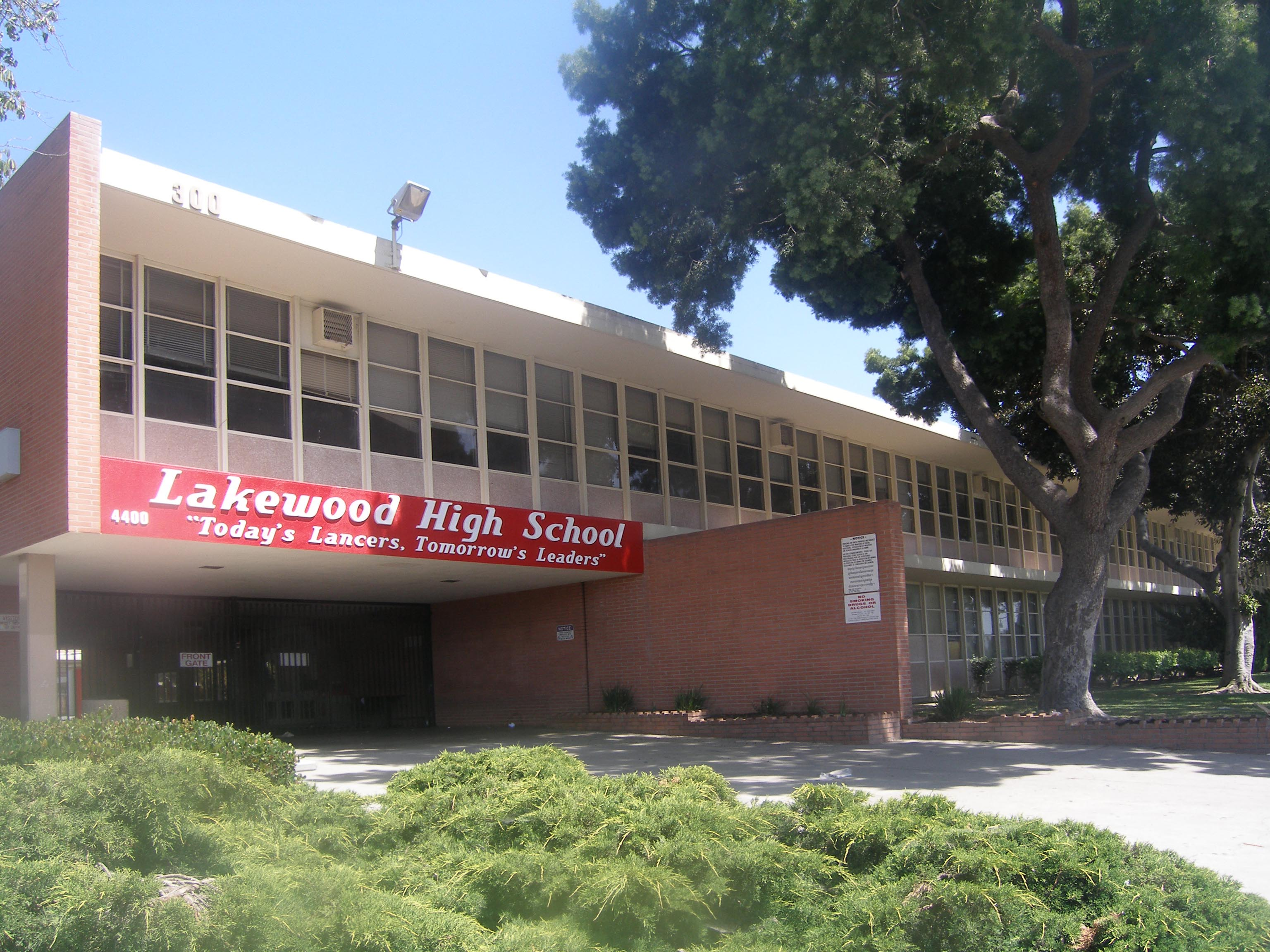
Lakewood High School

Lakewood is served primarily by three school districts: Long Beach Unified School District (LBUSD), Bellflower Unified School District (BUSD), and ABC Unified School District (ABCUSD). Small portions are served by Paramount Unified School District (PUSD).

LBUSD schools located in Lakewood include:

- Cleveland Elementary School
- Gompers Elementary School
- Holmes Elementary School
- MacArthur Elementary School
- Madison Elementary School
- Riley Elementary School
- Hoover Middle School
- Lakewood High School

BUSD schools located in Lakewood include:

- Craig Williams Elementary School
- Esther Lindstrom Elementary School
- Stephen Foster Elementary School
- Intensive Learning Center
- Mayfair High School

ABCUSD schools located in Lakewood include:

- Aloha Elementary School
- Melbourne Elementary School
- Palms Elementary School
- Willow Elementary School
- Artesia High School

The sole comprehensive high school of PUSD is Paramount High School.

== Infrastructure ==
The San Gabriel River Bike Trail is adjacent to Rynerson Park. Los Cerritos Community News serves the city.

=== Emergency services ===
Fire protection in Lakewood is provided by the Los Angeles County Fire Department with ambulance transport by Care Ambulance Service.

The Los Angeles County Sheriff's Department operates the Lakewood Station in Lakewood.

The city of Lakewood operates a law enforcement helicopter patrol independent of the Los Angeles County Sheriff's Aero Bureau called Sky Knight. Founded in 1966, it was the first day-and-night helicopter patrol program in the nation (aerial units had previously been used for search and rescue). Sky Knight flies with a civilian pilot and a sheriff's deputy as observer.

== See also ==
- Lakewood Center, one of the largest malls in the United States
- Los Angeles County Public Library
- Los Angeles County Sheriff's Department
- Lakewood Village, Long Beach, California
