= UCI Health – Lakewood =

- UC Irvine Health

Geography
- Location: 3700 East South Street, Lakewood, California, United States
- Coordinates: 33.8602°N 118.1486°W

Organization
- Care system: Private hospital
- Type: General hospital
- Affiliated university: University of California, Irvine

Services
- Emergency department: Yes
- Beds: 172

History
- Former name: Lakewood Regional Medical Center

Links
- Website: www.ucihealth.org/Locations/Lakewood/UCI-Health-lakewood
- Lists: Hospitals in California

UCI Health – Lakewood is a for-profit hospital in Lakewood, California, United States. It was formerly owned by health care provider Tenet Healthcare and is now owned by UC Irvine Health.

== History ==
In late April 2010, B. Joseph Badalian was appointed as CEO of Lakewood Regional Medical Center by Tenet Healthcare.

In late January 2011, Lakewood Regional Medical Center started to allow its patients to schedule an appointment online to see a physician at its emergency department with InQuickER.

In late December 2012, Lakewood Regional Medical Center was dropped by Health Net, after Tenet Healthcare wanted a higher reimbursement rate.

On January 20, 2014, Ron Galonsky became CEO of Lakewood Regional Medical Center.

In late October 2020, employees belonging to SEIU United Healthcare Workers West threatened a 1-day strike at the hospital due to COVID-19 safety measures.

On January 1, 2021, California Governor's Office of Emergency Services announced that Lakewood Regional Medical Center would be getting help from the United States Army Corps of Engineers, the hospital officially received help one day later. They evaluated and upgraded the oxygen system which was overtaxed due to the COVID-19 pandemic.

In late August 2021, caregivers approved a new contract for hire pay and benefits, ending their strike.

On February 1, 2024, UCI Health, part of the University of California, Irvine agreed to purchase Lakewood Regional Medical Center from Tenet Healthcare. On March 27, UCI Health officially took over the management of Lake Regional Medical Center and rebranded it to UCI Health – Lakewood.

== See also ==
- List of hospitals in California
