= Arie Dudai =

Israeli architect

- אריה דודאי (Hebrew); Арье (Лиоля) Дудкин (Russian)
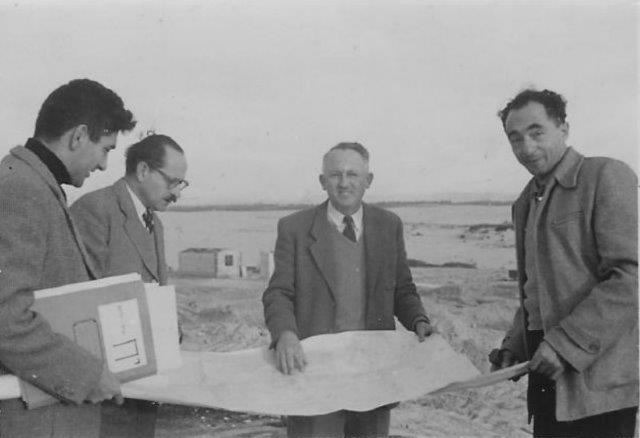
- Dudai (on the right) alongside architects Menachem Cohen (on the left) and Yitzhak Perlstein (in the center), planning the city of Ashdod, 1957.
- Born: Арье (Лиоля) Дудкин; 1911; Ukraine, Russian Empire
- Died: 1982
- Citizenship: Israel
- Occupations: Architect, urban planner

Arie Dudai (Hebrew: אריה דודאי, Russian: Арье (Лиоля) Дудкин, romanized: Arie (Liola) Dudkin; 1911–1982) was an Israeli architect and urban planner, born in Ukraine, then part of the Russian Empire. He served as the second chairman of the "Association for Environmental Planning in Israel" (Note: Hebrew: האיגוד לתכנון סביבתי בישראל) between 1967 and 1969.

Dudai was instrumental in designing key urban projects such as the master plan for Ashdod, and held senior positions including Chief Planner at the World Zionist Organization's Settlement Department and the Ministry of Housing. He also led the Institute for Planning and Development, where he contributed to urban development projects in Africa and Asia, most notably heading the United Nations planning team in Singapore. Dudai's legacy endures as one of the "fathers of planning" in Israel, whose vision and expertise helped lay the foundations for modern urban planning in Israel.

== Early life ==
Dudai was born in 1911 in Ukraine, then part of the Russian Empire, under the name Arieh (Liola) Dudkin, and immigrated with his parents to Mandatory Palestine (Eretz Yisrael). After graduating from high school in Tel Aviv, he traveled to Belgium to study architecture.

== Biography ==
In 1930, while residing in the United Kingdom, Dudai joined the Royal Air Force as a pilot. After World War II, he returned to Mandatory Palestine and participated in the War of Independence. In 1949, he was appointed a senior planner in the Planning Department (Hebrew: אגף התכנון), then managed by architects Arieh Sharon and Zion Hashimshoni, (Note: Brother of Avia Hashmishoni) operating under the Prime Minister's Office and the Ministry of Interior. Dudai was responsible for planning the Gush Dan area within the department.

Between 1957 and 1959, Dudai worked together with architect Yitzhak Perlstein on designing the master plan for the city of Ashdod, commissioned by the Ashdod Company. The plan included 16 residential quarters, each with an area of between 0.5 and 1.2 dunams and a square shape, with each neighborhood comprising about 3,000 to 6,000 housing units for 12,000 to 21,500 people. The plan (D/313 (Note: ד/313)) was officially approved on 6 May 1960, and since then, the city of Ashdod has been built almost precisely according to its defined scale and guidelines.

At the beginning of 1953, changes occurred in the Planning Department; its scope and powers were reduced, and its center was relocated from Tel Aviv to capital Jerusalem, under the new Minister of Interior, Israel Rokach. In response, Dudai decided to resign, together with Arieh Sharon, Tzion Hashimshoni, and Heinz Rau.

In 1954, he was appointed chief planner of the settlement division of the World Zionist Organization. In 1958, he replaced Arthur Glikson (Note: Glikson served in the position between 1953 and 1957.) as chief planner in the Housing Department (later the Ministry of Construction and Housing). At the end of the 1950s, he began teaching at the Technion in Haifa.

In the early 1960s, Dudai began serving as the general director of a new research institute, established by the Ministry of Foreign Affairs and the Ministry of Housing, called the Institute for Planning and Development (IPD), which focused on large-scale urban development projects in developing countries and in Israel. As part of his work at the institute, he designed several master plans, including the plan for Sierra Leone, which he prepared together with Ursula Olsener in 1965. Together with Olsener, the two also worked at the institute on a master plan in 1964 and an outline plan for the city of Modi’in in 1968, titled "Macabit: Conceptual Framework for a New City" and "Modi’in: Proposed Plan for a New City".

In 1967, he was appointed as the second chairman of the "Association for Environmental Planning in Israel" (later the Israel Association of United Architects), a position he held until 1969.

Following the 1973 Yom Kippur War, many countries severed diplomatic relations with Israel, which led to the decline of the status and activity of the Institute for Planning and Development. Dudai left the institute during this period and began working as a United Nations envoy to Singapore. In his role in Singapore, he led the team responsible for a development plan for the island, which at the time had 4 million inhabitants. He worked on this project for 4.5 years, after which a conceptual plan was presented to the Government of Singapore as a basis for detailed planning. Afterward, he returned to Israel to work on a conceptual plan for the future development of Mitzpe Ramon in the Negev desert.

== Legacy ==
In his 1997 article "Fathers and Sons in the Physical Planning of Israel" (Hebrew: אבות ובנים בתכנון הפיסי של ישראל), geographer Elisha Efrat referred to Dudai as one of the "fathers of planning" (Note: Alongside Arieh Sharon, Arthur Glikson, Yitzhak Perlstein, Heinz Rau, Yehuda Levinson, Tzion Hashimshoni, Eliezer Brutzkus, and others.) in Israel, who led the country's physical planning during the early 1950s under the Prime Minister's Office headed by David Ben-Gurion.

== Personal life ==
Dudai lived in Tel Aviv. He died in 1982 after a serious illness.
