= Kaplan Award =

Israeli award

The Kaplan Award, also known as Kaplan Prize, is an Israeli award given annually to individuals and organizations for streamlining and increasing work productivity. The award was founded in 1954 in honor of Eliezer Kaplan, the first Minister of Finance of Israel. The winners are determined and presented by the Ministry of Labor.

== Recipients ==
- 1958 - Louis H. Boyar and Mae Boyar
- 1959 - Edward D. Mitchell
- 1960 - Julius Fligelman
- 1961 - Mrs. Thomas Neiman
- 1962 - Jack Kahan, Super-Sol
- 1963 - Moshe Roseman
- 1964 - Bernard J. Glickman, and Eli Hayon
- 1965 - Israel Friend
- 1966 - Harry Abrams
- 1969 - Harry Sternfield
- 1971 - Sam and Charlotte Scharf
- 1972 - Mrs. David Simon
- 1975 - Yehuda Shinnar, Zvi Axelrod, David Weiss, Tucia Lenman, and Eli Shapira
- 1985 - Haim Tagari
