= Lakewood Center =

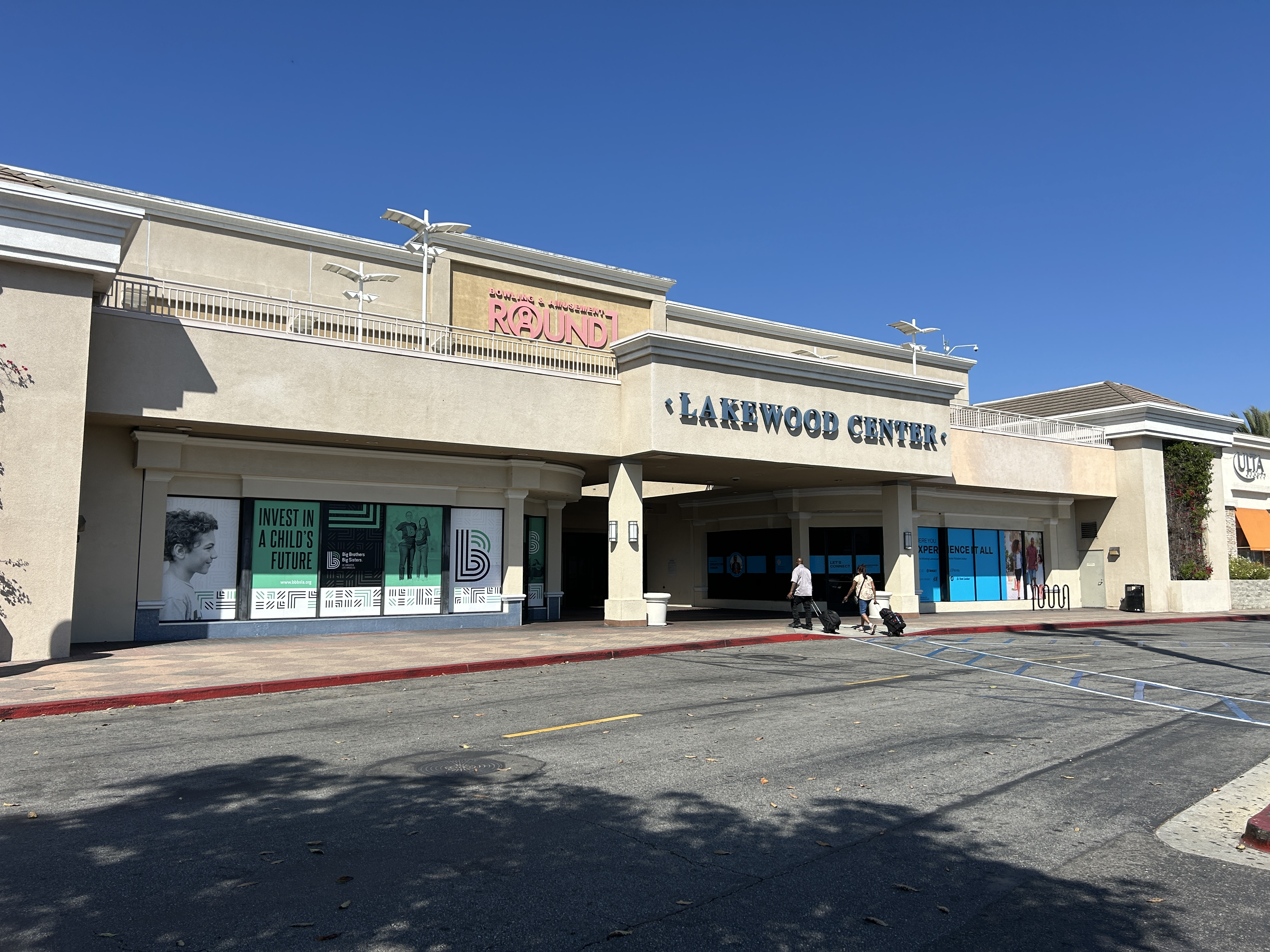
- Lakewood Center in 2026
- Location: Lakewood, California, United States
- Coordinates: 33.85047°N 118.14011°W
- Opened: February 18, 1952
- Developer: May Centers
- Manager: Pacific Retail Capital Partners
- Owner: Pacific Retail Capital Partners, Lyon Living, and Silverpeak
- Num. of stores: 225
- Num. of anchor tenants: 11
- Floor area: 2,069,000 sq ft (192,200 m^{2}) (GLA)
- Floors: 1 (2 in Round One and Target, 3 in JCPenney, 4 in Macy's)
- Website: shoplakewoodcenter.com

Lakewood Center is a super-regional shopping mall in Lakewood, California. Lakewood Center opened in 1952 and was enclosed in 1978.

The interior mall is anchored by Costco, JCPenney, Macy's, a Round One Entertainment center, and Target. Several businesses surround the mall property, including 24 Hour Fitness, Albertsons, Best Buy, Burlington, and The Home Depot.

At 2,069,000 square feet (192,200 m^{2}), the Lakewood Center is ranked among the largest retail shopping malls by gross leasable area in the United States.

== History ==
Lakewood Center opened in February 1952, serving the post-war planned community of Lakewood. The mall was originally anchored by two department stores, a large May Company and a much smaller three-level, 88,000-square-foot (8,200 m^{2}) Butler Brothers.

Upon opening on February 18, 1952, the four-level, 346,700-square-foot (32,210 m^{2}) May Company-Lakewood was the largest suburban department store in the world.

New stores were built around 1954-1955 in a section of the mall called the Faculty Shops, though they were not connected to the mall proper. 1965 brought two new department stores to the property: a four-level Bullock's and a two-level Buffums, both in standalone locations outside of the mall. Two years later, the existing mall was expanded to accommodate a two-level, 173,000-square-foot (16,100 m^{2}) JCPenney store on the mall's south end. A standalone Pacific Theatres two-screen cinema opened in the mall's parking lot in 1968, which was later expanded to four screens in 1975. The 1970s brought another department store to the property, with a two-level, 155,000-square-foot (14,400 m^{2}) Montgomery Ward opening in 1975 in place of the former Butler Bros., which shuttered the previous year. The Lakewood Center continued to grow in size and scale into the 1980s, with the addition of another Pacific-owned three-screen cinema (branded Pacific Theatres Lakewood Center South 1-2-3) adjacent to Buffums in 1981. A new wing anchored by a two-level, 80,000-square-foot (7,400 m^{2}) Mervyn's was constructed on the eastern side of the center in 1982, adding a second corridor to the mall's barbell shape.

Consolidation in the department store industry led to several major changes at the Lakewood Center, as their large spaces began to turn over. Buffums shuttered in 1991 as a result of a company liquidation, while Bullock's closed in 1993 due to the bankruptcy of parent company R.H. Macy & Co. That same year, May Company consolidated its two department stores nameplates in the western United States - May Co. and Robinson's - into Robinsons-May. The southern Pacific Theatres complex expanded into the former Buffums in 1992, adding six more screens in the process, while the former Bullock's was razed to accommodate The Home Depot, which opened in 1995.

The original Pacific Theatres four-screen complex was shuttered in 1998 for a dramatic expansion and renovation, and reopened in 1999 as a modern sixteen-screen multiplex.

Changes continued into the new millennium, as a new Mervyn's store was constructed adjacent to its original 1982 location. The new, single-level Mervyn's opened in August 2000, with the original Mervyn's building then repurposed as a new wing of shops leading to a newly-constructed two-level, 210,000-square-foot (20,000 m^{2}) Macy's - the first newly-built Macy's store in Southern California. At the same time, Montgomery Ward shuttered as part of a chainwide liquidation, ending operations in March 2001. The former Montgomery Ward was then demolished to accommodate a new two-level, 160,000-square-foot (15,000 m^{2}) Target store, which opened in October 2003.

Robinsons-May was rebranded as a Macy's after the merger of May Company with Macy's parent Federated Department Stores in 2006. The Macy's store built only five years earlier was shuttered in favor of the larger Robinsons-May building, and the one-time Macy's was demolished the following year and replaced by an unattached Costco warehouse, which opened in February 2009. The southern Pacific Theatres complex closed in 2008 and was replaced by a 24 Hour Fitness. Finally, Mervyn's filed for bankruptcy protection in 2008 and closed its stores in 2009, leading to Forever 21 purchasing the company's Lakewood lease and opening a large-scale store in the former Mervyn's building. However, due to the companies decline, in March 2025, Forever 21 closed its location at Lakewood Center, due to the filing of a Chapter 11 Bankruptcy. All other Forever 21 locations in the U.S. were closed as well around the same time. The space is currently vacant, being temporarily occupied by an Imaginarium 360.

The property's remaining Pacific Theatres complex closed temporarily in March 2020 due to the COVID-19 pandemic, only to close permanently a year later. On July 21, 2023 the Lakewood Center Theaters were reopened by independent movie theater chain Starlight Cinemas.

In August 2025, Macerich sold the Lakewood Center to Pacific Retail Capital Partners, Lyon Living, and Silverpeak for $332 million. The mall is planned to undergo many changes, and possibly turned into a mixed-use development mall.

== Public transit access ==
The mall is serviced by LACMTA Routes 265 and 266 along with Long Beach Transit Routes 91, 93, 103, 111, 112 and 191.

Most of these routes stop along Lakewood Blvd and Hardwick St in front of Macy's while the 191 stops at Del Amo Blvd. The 91 only runs to the mall on weekends and holidays.
