= Philip F. Mangano =

American businessman

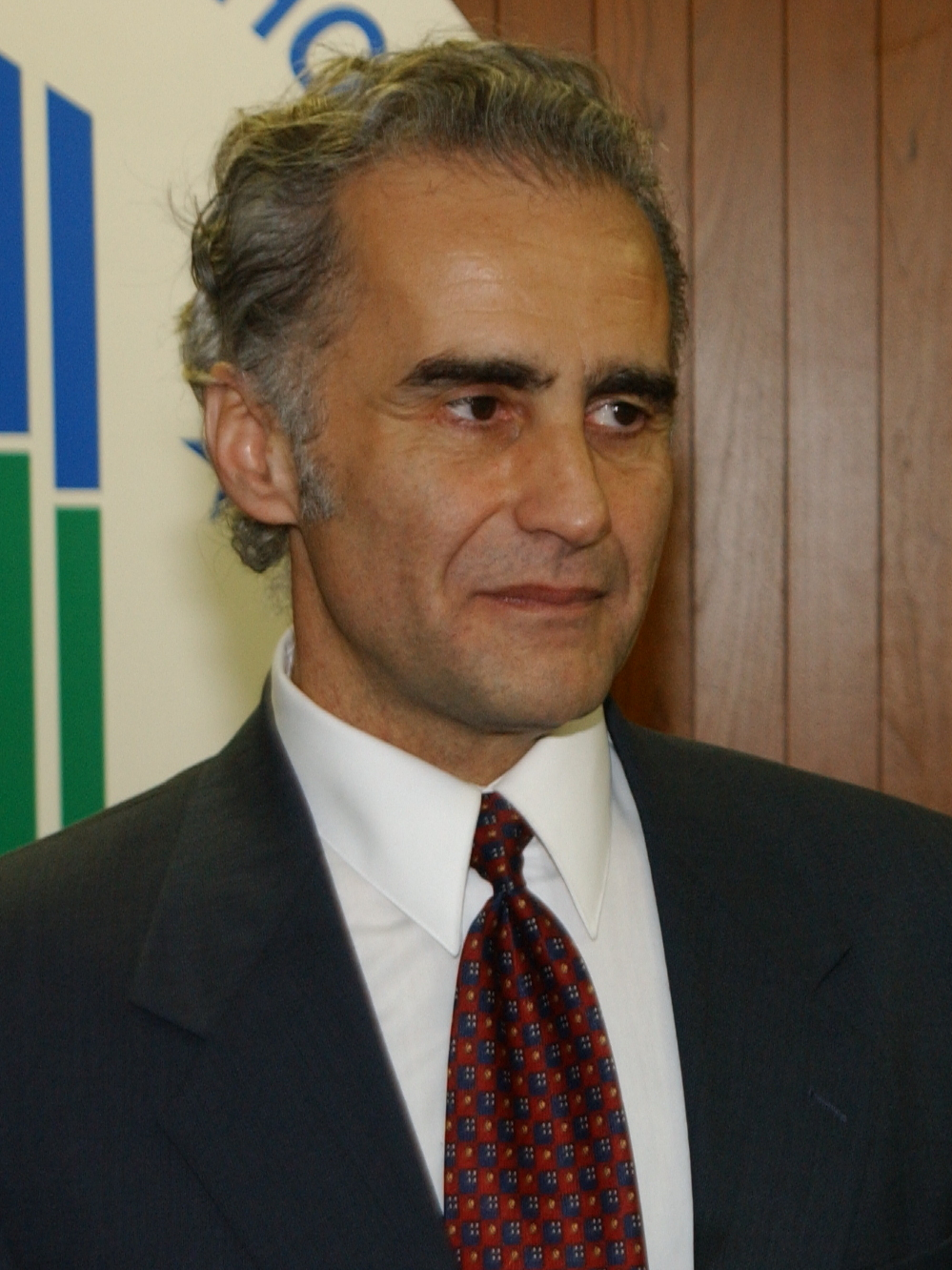
- Mangano in 2002
- Born: Philip Francesco Mangano; November 1947 (age 78–79); Boston, MA
- Education: University of Puget Sound Doctor of Humane Letters (Honoris Causa); Boston University (B.A.); Gordon-Conwell Theological Seminary (M.A.)
- Occupations: advocate and policy analyst
- Known for: work in homelessness policy and first director of US ICH

Philip F. Mangano (born November 1947) is the president and CEO of The American Round Table to Abolish Homelessness and former Executive Director of the White House United States Interagency Council on Homelessness.

== Early life ==
Mangano was awarded the degree of Doctor of Humane Letters (Honoris Causa) from University of Puget Sound, holds a B.S degree from Boston University and M.A. degree from Gordon-Conwell Theological Seminary in Massachusetts. He also has studied Business Law in 1978 at UCLA and Entertainment law in 1979 at USC.

== Career ==
From 1976 to 1981, Mangano was president and owner of Street Level Artists Agency for musicians. He was inspired to help poor people after seeing the Franco Zeffirelli film Brother Sun Sister Moon about St Francis of Assisi. Mangano sold his business in Los Angeles and returned to his native Boston, where he first worked on a breadline at St. Anthony Shrine in downtown Boston from 1981 to 1984. He later became Director of Homeless Services for the City of Cambridge, MA in 1986 as growing family homelessness led to emergency shelter placements in motels. As Director for the Family Homelessness and Housing Programs operated by St. Paul African Methodist Episcopal Church (1990–1993), Mangano worked closely with the historic African-American church and the Cambridge Black Pastors’ Conference and co-founded Cambridge Clergy for Affordable Housing, a multi-congregational effort to respond to homelessness issues. In 1990 he became Founding Executive Director of the Massachusetts Housing and Shelter Alliance (MHSA), a statewide advocacy alliance of more than 80 community-based organizations focused on individuals experiencing homelessness and the federal, state, and local resources to meet emergency needs and housing solutions.

In 2002, Mangano was appointed by President George W. Bush to be the Executive Director of the White House United States Interagency Council on Homelessness. He led the national strategy to prevent and end homelessness from 2002 – 2009 with the Council’s 20 federal agency members, including in the transitional phase of the President Barack Obama administration.

He reframed the national response to homelessness around business principles and practices, and quantifiable results in reducing homelessness. During his tenure, the first documented national decreases in homelessness, including a 37% decrease in street and chronic homelessness and a 17% overall decrease in homelessness, were achieved. The national results were spurred by a federal investment approach that called for strategies to be research and data driven, performance-based, consumer-centric, and results-oriented. Housing First, an innovative technology and evidence-based practice based on consumer preference and cost effectiveness, was a key focus. As of 2023, the program is central to Federal homelessness policy.

Mangano initiated interagency and community collaborations with the U.S. Conference of Mayors, the National League of Cities, the National Association of Counties, and the National Governors Association, focused on replication of the interagency council strategy in every state and encouraging local governments to partner in over 350 plans to end homelessness.

In 2004, he initiated international discussion on homelessness with the creation of regular tri-partite meetings with peers in government and research in the UK, Canada, and Australia.

Since its launch in 2008 to house homeless veterans, Mangano has advocated for the HUD-VASH housing voucher program and its effectiveness. As reported by the New York Times article in 2024, the program has helped reduce veteran homelessness.

Following his work in Washington, Mangano established the American Round Table to Abolish Homelessness in 2009 and serves as president and CEO, working directly with state and local jurisdictional leaders. He was announced as a member of Governor Newsom’s Council of Regional Homeless Advisors, which he joined in July 2019. He also served as the Vice Chair of the VA Secretary’s Advisory Board on homeless veterans in Los Angeles from 2017 to 2023.

In October 2022, Mangano was named as a member of the Cal Interagency Council on Homelessness Advisory Committee. He has also been invited to join mayors, policymakers and others at Bipartisan Policy Center events to discuss expanding housing solutions for homeless individuals and veterans.

Mangano also advocated for recognizing unaccompanied homeless women as a specific subpopulation in HUD homeless programs. Historically, HUD defined homelessness by individuals or families, only recognizing women among veterans. At national gatherings convened by his organization, he highlighted the lack of resources for unaccompanied homeless women. Since 2015, HUD started reporting on the number of unaccompanied homeless women.

== Books ==
Mangano is the author of The Primacy of Research: Getting to Housing First in the United States – A Policymaker’s Perspective in Housing, Citizenship, and Communities for People with Serious Mental Illness (Oxford University Press, 2017). He co-authored the working paper on Ending Homelessness for the 2015 American Academy of Social Work and Social Welfare Grand Challenge to End Homelessness and authored Replenishing Social Capital in the Lives of Homeless People: Overcoming Stigma Through Housing and Employment.

== Bibliography ==
- Mangano, Philip (foreword) (2019). Homelessness among U.S. veterans: critical perspectives. New York, NY: Oxford University Press. ISBN 9780190695132.

== Reception ==
Malcolm Gladwell, describing his The New Yorker article Million Dollar Murray: Why problems like homelessness may be easier to solve than to manage, stated that “[Mangano] was the Paul Revere of this new policy . . . traveled incessantly . . . making the argument that it is cheaper to solve homelessness than to treat homelessness, that the homeless person who stays on the streets costs us all far more money than if we simply were to go and give that person an apartment, you know, someone to watch over them and, finally, a job . . . And I wrote a piece about his ideas, his crusade, and also the kind of larger intellectual context in which he was operating.”

David Frum in The National Review said “Mangano’s approach to homelessness has transformed a situation once seen as hopeless by discarding orthodoxies once seen as unquestionable. He deserves immense credit.”

According to The Economist, “As Philip Mangano points out, the main task is not spending money but co-ordination—bringing together programs such as Medicaid and food stamps and, most important, getting the cities to join in . . . “

Governing magazine wrote about “Mangano is open to any tactic, as long as it is backed by data showing that it works to end homelessness rather than shift the problem somewhere else. Mangano’s worldview resonates with local officials who are at their wits’ end on the homeless problem. By framing the issue around research, not ideology, he has forged unlikely alliances between the Bush administration and many Democratic mayors.”

== Recognition ==
Mangano is a Knight of La Nuova Porziuncola of St. Francis of Assisi in San Francisco and serves on the Board of Advisors of the innovative Harvard Square Youth2Youth Initiative. He has served as a member of the Board of Directors of the Dalai Lama Center for Ethics and Transformative Values at MIT. He is also a recipient of commendations from the Massachusetts Departments of Mental Health and Public Health.

Apart from that, some notable recognition includes:

- Recognized by the International Downtown Association (IDA) in 2008 with IDA’s most notable award, the Lifetime Achievement Award
- Named by Governing Magazine in 2006 as the first and only Federal official to be honored with its Public Official of the Year Award
- Recognized by the U.S. Conference of Mayors for his vision, leadership, and results in creating a national partnership with jurisdictional leaders
- Recognized with a Career Achievement Award by the first International Homelessness Research Conference in 2013
- Recognized by the National Human Services Assembly with its 2006 Essence of Leadership award for excellence in national public sector leadership
- Recognized with the Rev. Canon Brian S. Kelley Public Servant Award in 2006 by the Massachusetts Housing and Shelter Alliance
