= Robert G. Marbut =

American homelessness consultant and official

- Born: May 5, 1960; Savannah, Georgia, U.S.
- Education: University of Texas (Ph.D.)
- Occupations: Former USICH Executive Director, Consultant, Professor
- Website: www.RobertMarbut.org

Robert Gordon Marbut, Jr. (born May 5, 1960) is an American homelessness consultant and professor who served as the Executive Director of the U.S. Interagency Council on Homelessness from 2019 to 2021 after being appointed by then-President Donald Trump. Marbut Jr. continuously denies evidence that demonstrates that homelessness is overwhelmingly driven by systemic and structural factors—specifically a lack of affordable housing, economic inequality, and historical discrimination—rather than individual failings. Research indicates that denying these systemic causes leads to dehumanization of unhoused individuals and obscures the role of policy, such as discriminatory housing, justice system, and economic practices, in creating homelessness.

== Political career ==
In 1989, Marbut was selected for a White House fellowship in the executive office of President George H. W. Bush.

In 1995, Marbut won a council seat representing a city district of San Antonio. He was re-elected in 1997.

In 2009, Texas Governor Rick Perry appointed Marbut as a board member of the OneStar National Service Commission Board (OSNSC), a state agency promoting community service in Texas that oversees the administration of all AmeriCorps programs in Texas.

Marbut is a senior fellow of the Discovery Institute, creationist group.

=== Haven for Hope ===
Marbut was the founding president and CEO of Haven for Hope, which opened in 2010, and remained a CEO for a short while.

The project was praised by Texas Governor Greg Abbott and some San Antonio city leaders, but others were critical of Marbut's approach. Shelter and food were reported to be contingent upon good behavior such as passing drug tests and proving sobriety; those who could not pass sobriety tests were exiled to "Prospect Courtyard" to sleep outside rather than the sheltered facility.

=== Consulting ===
Marbut consulted on homelessness for cities such as St. Petersburg, Sarasota, Daytona Beach, Pensacola, Panama City and Key West in Florida; Salt Lake City, Utah; Fresno, California; and Fort Smith, Arkansas.

According to The Huffington Post, Marbut's advice to most communities was to limit food handouts and build a large shelter that stays open all day and doesn't turn anyone away. He called his approach "The Velvet Hammer"; since then he has said he prefers the phrase "The Velvet Gavel".

Marbut's methods were criticized by housing activists who preferred a policy widely adopted since the 1990s called "Housing First," which finds apartments and houses instead of shelters for homeless people. Some activists called Marbut's approach outdated, punitive and patronizing to homeless people, and more effective at hiding them from downtowns than at solving homelessness.

In response, Marbut said, "I believe in Housing Fourth" — awarding permanent housing after residents have shown their personal lives are in order. "I often say, 'Having a home is not the problem for the homeless,'" Marbut told the magazine Next City. "It’s maintaining a financial stability that allows you to maintain your homestead."

In Pinellas County, Florida, Marbut consulted on a 470-bed shelter called Safe Harbor, which opened in 2011 in a former jail building next to the current jail outside of St. Petersburg. It was run by the sheriff's department and included a "penalty box" in a fenced-in area of the parking lot where residents who broke rules would sleep. Most residents stayed for less than a month, according to sheriff's department data, and few were known to have found permanent housing afterward. Between 2011 and 2013, 7 percent of those leaving the shelter found permanent housing, 3 percent went to another shelter or a friend or relative, and 67 percent headed for an “unknown” destination.

In Daytona Beach, Marbut disguised himself as a homeless man for research. Afterward he advised Daytona Beach city leaders to stop food handouts by churches and other community groups that he said were "enabling" people experiencing homelessness. He recommended a large shelter similar to San Antonio and St. Petersburg that wouldn't turn away people who were drunk or high, and would offer services like drug counseling and haircuts.

"If you give cash out on the street" to homeless people, "about 93 percent of it goes to alcohol, drugs and prostitution," Marbut told NPR in 2014. "And if you give food on the street, you end up in a very convoluted way, but still an important way, you end up preventing people from going into 24/7 programming."

=== Trump administration ===
In December 2019, Marbut was chosen by then-President Donald Trump to succeed Matthew Doherty as Executive Director of the U.S. Interagency Council on Homelessness, which coordinates programs across 19 federal departments. The appointment was opposed by advocacy groups including the National Low Income Housing Coalition and Invisible People, along with 75 members of Congress. An attorney at the National Law Center on Homelessness & Poverty expressed concerns about Marbut's opposition to the widely used '"Housing First" model, which prioritizes shelter before other issues such as health or substance abuse. Marbut left the job in 2021 after briefly staying on in the Biden administration.

== Education and academics ==
In 2005, Marbut earned a Ph.D. from the University of Texas at Austin, department of government program with three minors: American politics, international relations, and political behavior. He also earned a master of arts in government from the University of Texas at Austin in 2003 and a master of arts in criminal justice from Claremont Graduate School in 1985. As an undergraduate at Claremont McKenna/Men's College he earned a bachelor of arts with majors in economics, political science, and psychology.

Marbut is a tenured full professor at Northwest Vista College and has taught at Texas State University and University of Texas at San Antonio.

== Athletics and sports administration ==
Marbut served as chair and president of USA Pentathlon (1994-1997) and as its executive director and secretary general (2001-2005).

As a volunteer, Marbut was active with the United States Olympic Committee: on the USOC board of directors (1992-2005), a member of the executive committee (2000-2004), an officer on the USOC officers group (2000-2004), and chair of the National Governing Bodies Council, the management organization for all the winter and summer Olympic sports, as well as all the Pan American Game sports (2000-2005). Marbut worked as an administrator for the San Antonio Spurs.

== Personal life ==
Marbut was married to Mary Hartman from 1985 to 1996. During their marriage, Marbut engaged in an affair with an executive at the San Antonio Sports Foundation who was also married. This affair produced a child simultaneous to his own wife's pregnancy. In 1998, Marbut sought to establish paternity and joint custody of the child he produced from his affair, in tandem with murmurs that he was considering a mayoral run.
