= Mental Health Commission of Canada =

Canadian non-profit organization for mental health issues

The Mental Health Commission of Canada (MHCC) is a national non-profit organization created by the Canadian government in 2007 in response to a Senate committee tasked to study mental health, mental illness, and addiction. The committee appointed Michael J. L. Kirby as the first chairperson. The MHCC was endorsed by all the provinces and territories with exception to Quebec. The Commission is funded by Health Canada and has a ten-year mandate (from 2007 to 2017) enforced through a sunset clause. On 21 April 2015, Minister of Finance Joe Oliver announced that the 2015 federal budget calls for the renewal of the MHCC for another ten-year mandate starting in 2017–2018.

The organization is governed by a board of directors including government and non-governmental directors. Since 2013, the board has been assisted by an advisory council and a network of ambassadors. From 2007 to 2012, the board was assisted by eight advisory committees. The Commission is not responsible to undertake service-delivery or advocacy for mental health services. The aim is provide relevant jurisdictions and stakeholders with tools and information required to improve the quality of and access to mental health care.

The proposal for creation of the MHCC was made by the Canadian Senate Standing Committee on Social Affairs, Science and Technology in 2006 in their publication, "Out of the Shadows at Last", a comprehensive study of the state of mental health care in Canada.

== Mandate ==
The MHCC was tasked with three major objectives:

1. To develop a national mental health strategy (until 2008, Canada was the only G8 nation that did not have one).
2. To oversee the development and implementation of an anti-stigma and anti-discrimination campaign.
3. To create a Knowledge Exchange Centre, with the aim of mobilizing evidence-based knowledge to improve best practices and increasing dialogue across Canada.

In addition to the three initiatives stated above, a fourth initiative was added when the Commission entered into a five-year Health Canada funding agreement in 2008 to support five research demonstration projects on mental health and homelessness. Mental Health First Aid was added to the Commission in 2010.

The MHCC does not provide clinical services, direct fiscal or human resources related to clinical practice, monitor government performance, or engage in advocacy with government bodies. It operates outside the federal/provincial/territorial constitutional framework, working at all jurisdictional levels.

== Former Advisory Committees ==
From 2007 to 2012, the MHCC worked with eight committees, each having approximately 120 members with expertise and experience in a different field of mental health, in order to oversee their mandate. The committees were tasked with advising on the following major areas of concern:

Child and Youth

- The Evergreen Framework, a Canadian policy paper on mental health issues concerning children and youth.
- Evidence-based mental health services for youth through schools.
- The MHCC Youth Council

Family Caregivers

First Nations, Inuit and Metis

Mental Health and the Law

- assist in the development of best practices for law enforcement through the creation of The Police Project.
- develop tools to study the impact of human rights on the mentally ill and their involvement with the law.

Seniors

- the creation of guidelines to support people involved in the care of seniors.
- the drafting of the Seniors Mental Health Policy Lens Toolkit (SMPHL), a survey designed to assess the mental health of senior citizens.

Service Systems

- addressing issues surrounding peer support, immigrants, refugees, racially marginalized groups and housing.

Science

Workforce

- advising on the writing of the National Standard of Canada for Psychological Health and Safety in the Workplace.

== Other significant projects and initiatives ==
=== At Home ===
The Commission's "At Home" research project ("Chez Soi" in French) looked to address homelessness for people with mental illness by combining treatment with places to live, and is the largest experiment of its kind in the world. Taking place in Vancouver, Winnipeg, Toronto, Montreal and Moncton, the project is based on the Housing First model of the Pathways to Housing program in the United States, which has reported positive results in cities including New York, Philadelphia and Washington.

In 2012, the National Film Board of Canada (NFB) is documenting the results of the At Home project with the interactive web documentary Here At Home. Fifty short documentaries about the experiences of participants in At Home are being added to the NFB website until the summer of 2013. Directors on the NFB project include Manfred Becker (Toronto), Lynne Stopkewich (Vancouver) and Louiselle Noël (Moncton).

The research portion of this project concluded in March 2013.

=== Changing Directions, Changing Lives: The Mental Health Strategy for Canada ===
On May 8, 2012, Canada became the last of the G8 nations to create a national mental health strategy. The document, Changing Directions, Changing Lives: The Mental Health Strategy for Canada, set out six strategic aims, including implementation, prevention, diversity, access and delivery of services.

=== Opening Minds ===
The Opening Minds initiative was launched in 2009 to combat stigma against mental illness. The Commission invited organizations across the country to submit applications for to be considered for inclusion in the program. Currently they work with 65 partners and 45 active projects. It was decided that the projects would focus on four target groups, namely: healthcare providers, youth (12-18), workforce, and media.

=== Psychological Health and Safety in the Workplace Standard ===
On 16 January 2013, the MHCC announced the release of the Psychological Health and Safety in the Workplace Standard. This framework was designed to be adapted by Canadian companies in assisting them to implement policies and practices aimed at combatting mental illness and identifying potential hazards to their employees.

=== Partnership with the National Mental Health Commission of Australia ===
In March 2013, the MHCC announced a partnership with the National Mental Health Commission of Australia. The two countries signed a Memorandum of Understanding and agreed to share knowledge on best practices for mental health research.

=== Informing the Future: Mental Health Indicators for Canada ===
MHCC initiated Informing the Future to paint a picture of mental health in Canada. These indicators provide information on the mental health status of children and youth, adults, and seniors, as well as show how the mental health care system responds to mental illness.

== See also ==
- Canadian Mental Health Association
- Mental Health
- Partners for Mental Health
