= Fort St. Mary's =

Fort St. Mary's may refer to:

- one of several early colonial fortifications at St. Mary's City, Maryland
- a colonial fort at St. Mary's, Ohio
- a colonial fort at Peace River, Alberta
