= Fountain Hotel =

- The Fountain Hotel
- U.S. National Register of Historic Places
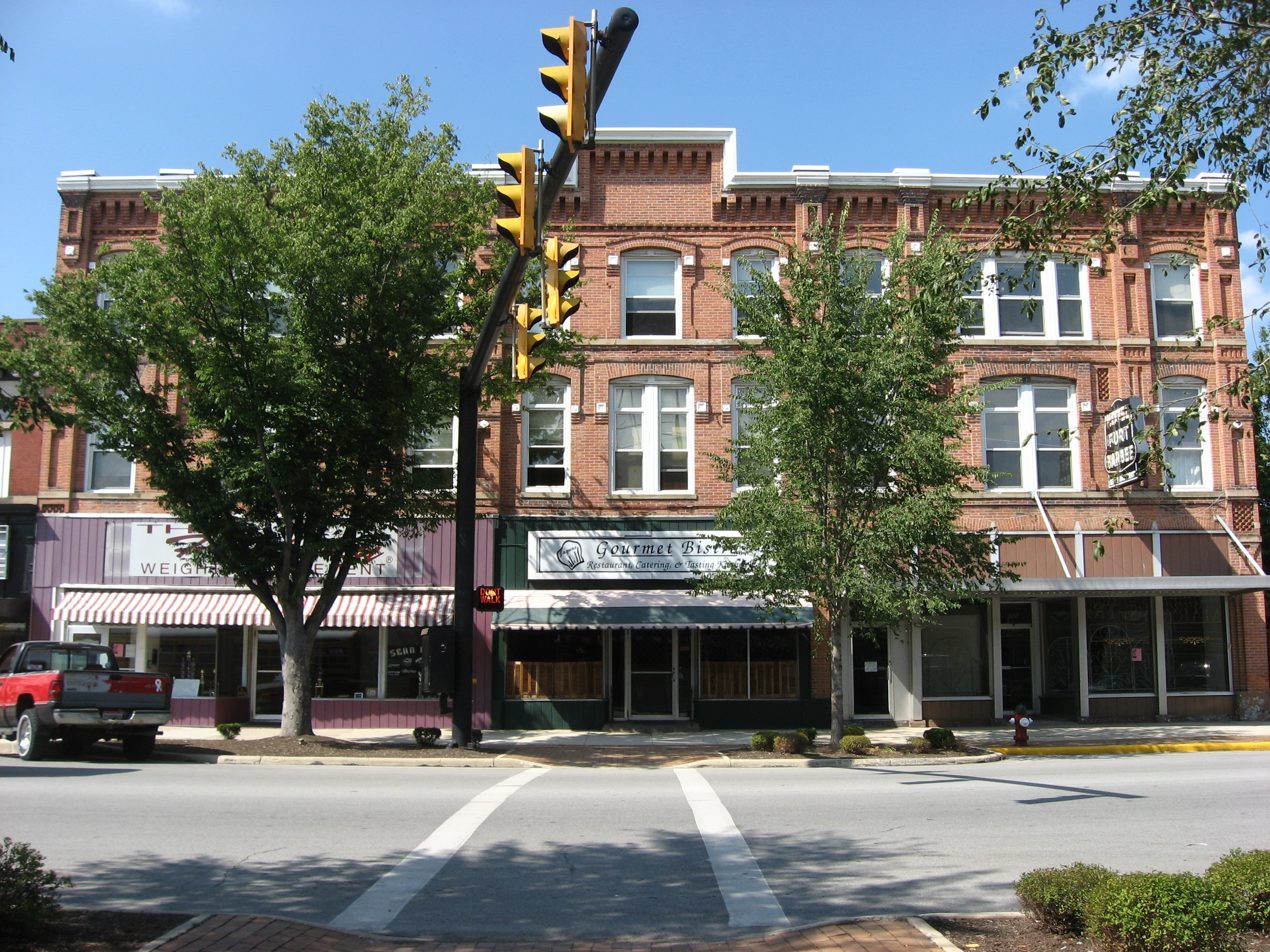
- Front of the hotel

- Location within Ohio Location within the United States
- Location: 100-110 W. Spring St., St. Marys, Ohio
- Coordinates: 40°32′34″N 84°23′20″W
- Area: 0.3 acres (0.12 ha)
- Built: 1889
- Architectural style: Late Victorian, Queen Anne
- NRHP reference No.: 97001564
- Added to NRHP: December 19, 1997

The Fountain Hotel is a historic former hotel in downtown St. Marys, Ohio, United States. Built in 1889 in a mixture of the Queen Anne and Victorian architectural styles, the hotel building sits in the 100 block of West Spring Street.

Also known as the "Fort Barbee Hotel," the Fountain Hotel is a brick building that is built on a foundation of sandstone and covered with an asphalt roof. On the first story, the facade is divided into multiple storefronts, but the rest of the hotel has been converted into housing for low-income individuals aged fifty-five or older. Conversion to its present format was carried out by the Muskingum Development Corporation in the 1990s, at a cost of $2 million to $3 million; aid was provided by the Minster State Bank, which offered reduced interest rates to the redevelopers.

Surrounding the Fountain Hotel are several other important community locations, such as the municipal building, the Buckeye Trail route along the Miami and Erie Canal, and a community park. Adjacent to the hotel is a small spring; once tapped to provide water for Fort St. Marys, which once occupied the location of the city's downtown, the spring was later converted into a fountain that became the hotel's namesake.

In 1997, the Fountain Hotel was listed on the National Register of Historic Places. Key to this designation was its place in local history and commerce, as it once played the role of a hotel, specialty store, and restaurant. Two other properties in St. Marys are listed on the Register: the Dr. Issac Elmer Williams House and Office, built in 1903, and the former Holy Rosary Catholic Church, which was destroyed one year before it was placed on the Register.
