= St. Marys, Ohio =

City in Ohio, US

- City
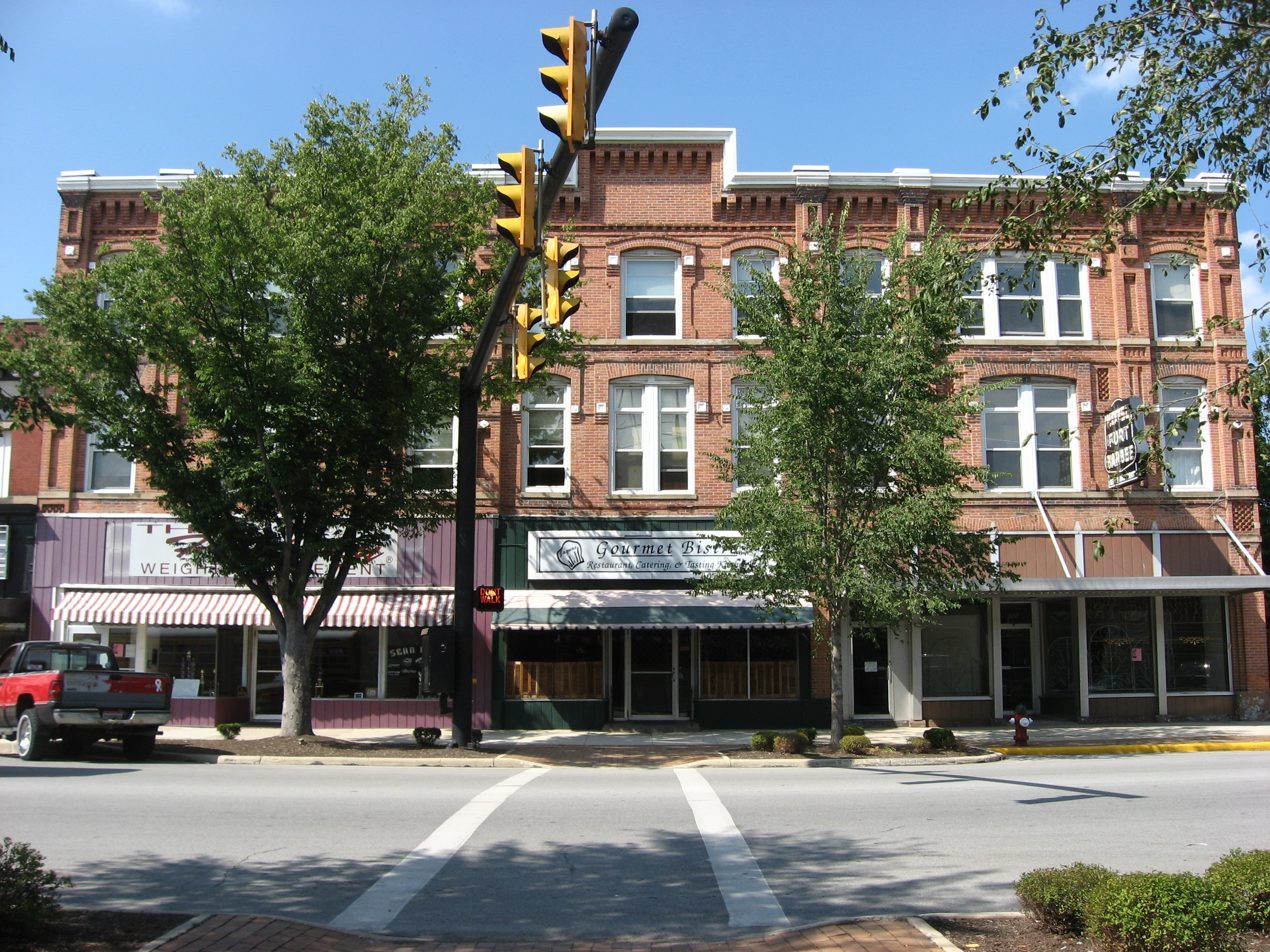
- Fountain Hotel, Downtown St. Marys

- Flag Seal
- Nickname: Ridertown (Note: Apparently from the name of the high school sports team, the Roughriders.)
- Motto: Where living is a pleasure
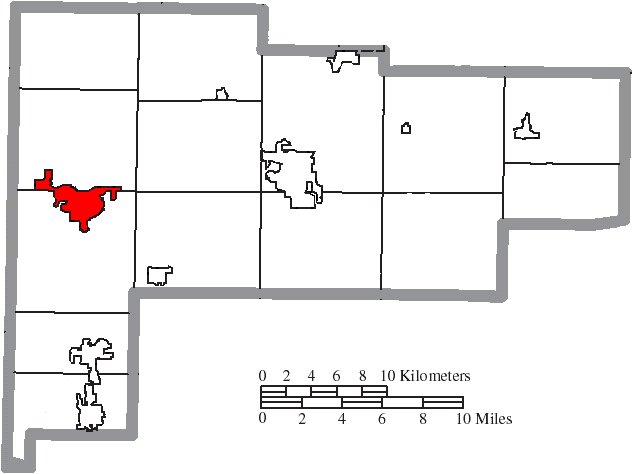
- Location of St. Marys in Auglaize County

- Location within Ohio Location within the United States
- Coordinates: 40°32′56″N 84°22′24″W
- Country: United States
- State: Ohio
- County: Auglaize
- Townships: St. Marys, Noble
- Founded: 1823
- Incorporated: 1834 (village); 1904 (city)

Government
  - Mayor: Joseph Hurlburt (R)
  - Director of Public Service and Safety: Gregory J. Foxhoven

Area
  - Total: 4.70 sq mi (12.17 km^{2})
  - Land: 4.67 sq mi (12.09 km^{2})
  - Water: 0.031 sq mi (0.08 km^{2})
- Elevation: 869 ft (265 m)

Population (2020)
  - Total: 8,397
  - Density: 1,798.9/sq mi (694.56/km^{2})
- Time zone: UTC-4 (EST)
  - Summer (DST): UTC-4 (EDT)
- ZIP code: 45885
- Area code: 419
- FIPS code: 39-69680
- GNIS feature ID: 2396505
- Website: www.cityofstmarys.net

St. Marys is a city in Auglaize County, Ohio, United States. Located in western Ohio, it is 11 miles (18 km) west of Wapakoneta and 20 miles (32 km) east of the Ohio–Indiana border. Founded in 1823, the city is located on a portage between the St. Marys and Auglaize river systems, which was a significant factor in its development before the era of canals. The population was 8,397 at the 2020 census. It is included in the Wapakoneta micropolitan area.

== History ==
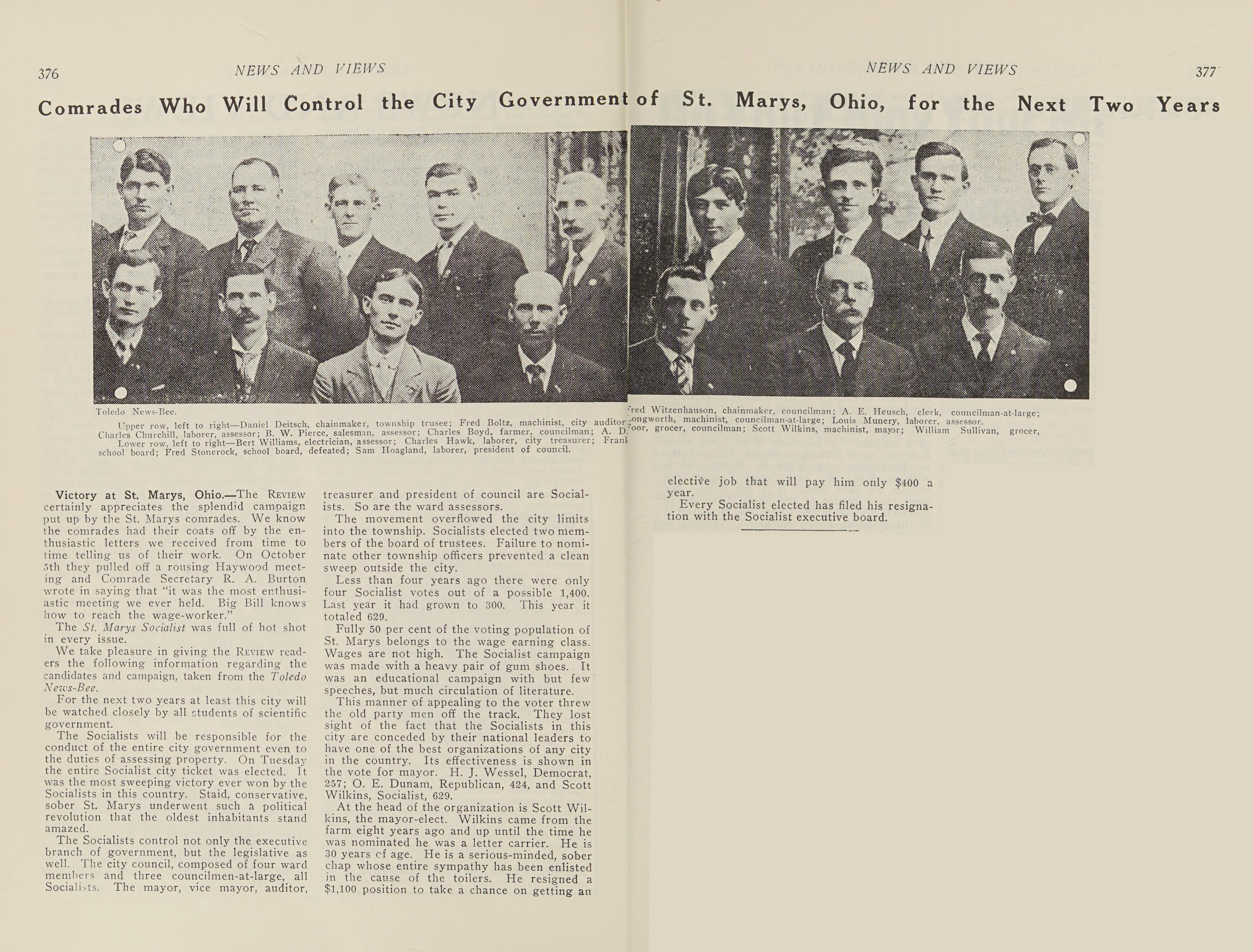
An article in the International Socialist Review detailing the landslide election victory of the Socialist Party in the municipal election in St. Marys, December 1911

After the Revolutionary War, the Shawnee village on the site became known as Girty's Town for the Indian traders James and Simon Girty, who had a trading post on the site. James Girty was originally a partner of Peter Loramie, but fled to the St. Marys River when Loramie's trading post was burned in 1782. Girty maintained his trading post between 1783 and 1790 and fled when General Harmar's army approached. He later returned to the post. When General Anthony Wayne approached the St. Marys area in 1794, James Girty packed up his goods and fled to Canada, thus ending the Girty Brothers era in Ohio. The village retained the name until the modern town was founded in 1823.

When General Wayne returned through the St. Marys area late in 1794 after the Battle of Fallen Timbers, he found the site deserted but noted its strategic location as a portage between the St. Mary's River and Auglaize River. He ordered a fort built on the location. Fort St. Mary's, named for the nearby river, was built by a detachment under Lieutenant John Michael in Oct. 1795 following the Treaty of Greenville. Lieutenant John Whistler was placed in charge of the garrison.

In 1812, Gen. William Henry Harrison found the fort in ruins, and built a fort named Fort Barbee on an adjacent site. Col. Joshua Barbee was placed in charge of the fort.

St. Marys was the site of the signing of the Treaty of St. Mary's of 1817, and the six treaties comprising Treaty of St. Mary's of 1818. The latter treaty secured about a third of the state of Indiana from the Miami and Delaware Indians for the United States. The fort was abandoned shortly afterward.

The earliest settlers arrived in 1820. St. Marys was founded by William Houston and John McCorkle, and Charles Murray, in 1823. They bought 400 acres (160 ha) of land and laid out the village of 68 lots. The village was incorporated as a town in 1834 and Judge Stacy Taylor was elected its first mayor. The town surpassed the threshold of 5,000 persons and became a city in 1904.

St. Marys was the county seat of Mercer County from 1824 until 1840 when the seat was moved to Celina. After Auglaize County was organized in 1848, St. Marys competed with Wapakoneta for the position as county seat but was ultimately unsuccessful in a controversial countywide election.

Three properties in St. Marys are listed on the National Register of Historic Places: the former Fountain Hotel, the Dr. Issac Elmer Williams House and Office, and the former Holy Rosary Catholic Church, which was destroyed one year before it was placed on the Register.

St. Marys is a part of the Tree City USA national program.

== Geography ==
According to the United States Census Bureau, the city has a total area of 4.62 square miles (11.97 km^{2}), of which 4.59 square miles (11.89 km^{2}) is land and 0.03 square miles (0.08 km^{2}) is water.

== Education ==
Saint Marys is home to Memorial High School.

== Demographics ==
Historical population
Census	Pop.	Note	%±
1840	92		—
1850	873		848.9%
1860	1,154		32.2%
1870	1,370		18.7%
1880	1,745		27.4%
1890	3,000		71.9%
1900	5,359		78.6%
1910	5,732		7.0%
1920	5,679		−0.9%
1930	5,433		−4.3%
1940	5,532		1.8%
1950	6,206		12.2%
1960	7,737		24.7%
1970	7,699		−0.5%
1980	8,414		9.3%
1990	8,441		0.3%
2000	8,342		−1.2%
2010	8,332		−0.1%
2020	8,397		0.8%
2025 (est.)	8,398		0.0%

=== 2020 census ===
As of the 2020 census, St. Marys had a population of 8,397. The median age was 37.5 years; 25.0% of residents were under the age of 18 and 16.8% of residents were 65 years of age or older. For every 100 females there were 98.9 males, and for every 100 females age 18 and over there were 95.0 males.

98.9% of residents lived in urban areas, while 1.1% lived in rural areas.

There were 3,434 households in St. Marys, of which 30.7% had children under the age of 18 living in them. Of all households, 46.1% were married-couple households, 19.5% were households with a male householder and no spouse or partner present, and 25.3% were households with a female householder and no spouse or partner present. About 30.9% of all households were made up of individuals and 13.4% had someone living alone who was 65 years of age or older.

There were 3,664 housing units, of which 6.3% were vacant. The homeowner vacancy rate was 1.9% and the rental vacancy rate was 4.8%.

Racial composition as of the 2020 census
Race	Number	Percent
White	7,878	93.8%
Black or African American	61	0.7%
American Indian and Alaska Native	15	0.2%
Asian	63	0.8%
Native Hawaiian and Other Pacific Islander	25	0.3%
Some other race	43	0.5%
Two or more races	312	3.7%
Hispanic or Latino (of any race)	159	1.9%

=== 2010 census ===
As of the 2010 census, there were 8,332 people, 3,283 households, and 2,194 families residing in the city. The population density was 1,815.3 inhabitants per square mile (700.9/km^{2}). There were 3,620 housing units at an average density of 788.7 per square mile (304.5/km^{2}). The racial makeup of the city was 96.7% White, 0.4% African American, 0.1% Native American, 0.7% Asian, 0.1% Pacific Islander, 0.4% from other races, and 1.5% from two or more races. Hispanic or Latino of any race were 1.3% of the population.

There were 3,283 households, of which 33.9% had children under the age of 18 living with them, 49.7% were married couples living together, 11.5% had a female householder with no husband present, 5.6% had a male householder with no wife present, and 33.2% were non-families. 28.9% of all households were made up of individuals, and 12.6% had someone living alone who was 65 years of age or older. The average household size was 2.51 and the average family size was 3.08.

The median age in the city was 37.5 years. 26.6% of residents were under the age of 18; 8.7% were between the ages of 18 and 24; 25% were from 25 to 44; 25.4% were from 45 to 64; and 14.4% were 65 years of age or older. The gender makeup of the city was 49.2% male and 50.8% female.

=== 2000 census ===
As of the 2000 census, there were 8,342 people, 3,218 households, and 2,240 families residing in the city. The population density was 1,926.7 inhabitants per square mile (743.9/km^{2}). There were 3,479 housing units at an average density of 803.5 per square mile (310.2/km^{2}). The racial makeup of the city was 97.49% White, 0.35% African American, 0.13% Native American, 0.98% Asian, 0.02% Pacific Islander, 0.14% from other races, and 0.88% from two or more races. Hispanic or Latino of any race were 0.46% of the population.

There were 3,218 households, out of which 35.1% had children under the age of 18 living with them, 54.9% were married couples living together, 10.6% had a female householder with no husband present, and 30.4% were non-families. 26.9% of all households were made up of individuals, and 12.0% had someone living alone who was 65 years of age or older. The average household size was 2.55 and the average family size was 3.10.

In the city the population was spread out, with 28.3% under the age of 18, 7.9% from 18 to 24, 28.5% from 25 to 44, 20.3% from 45 to 64, and 14.9% who were 65 years of age or older. The median age was 35 years. For every 100 females, there were 94.2 males. For every 100 females age 18 and over, there were 88.5 males.

The median income for a household in the city was $38,673, and the median income for a family was $44,247. Males had a median income of $38,371 versus $22,080 for females. The per capita income for the city was $17,682. About 5.7% of families and 7.3% of the population were below the poverty line, including 9.8% of those under age 18 and 4.9% of those age 65 or over.

== Sister cities ==
St. Marys has two sister cities, as designated by Sister Cities International:

- - Awaji, Japan
- - Lienen, Nordrhein-Westfalen, Germany

St. Marys' neighboring municipalities, Wapakoneta and New Knoxville, are sister cities with Lienen's neighbors, Lengerich and Ladbergen, respectively.

== Notable people ==
- Galen Cisco, MLB player and coach
- William K. Howard, film director
- Barbara Poppe, served in the Obama administration 2009-2014 as head of the United States Interagency Council on Homelessness
- Jim Tully, author
- Robert Vogel, professional marksman and competition shooter
- Chuck Weyant, racecar driver
- Johann August Ernst von Willich, Prussian military officer, early proponent of communism in Germany, general in Union Army during the American Civil War

== Gallery ==
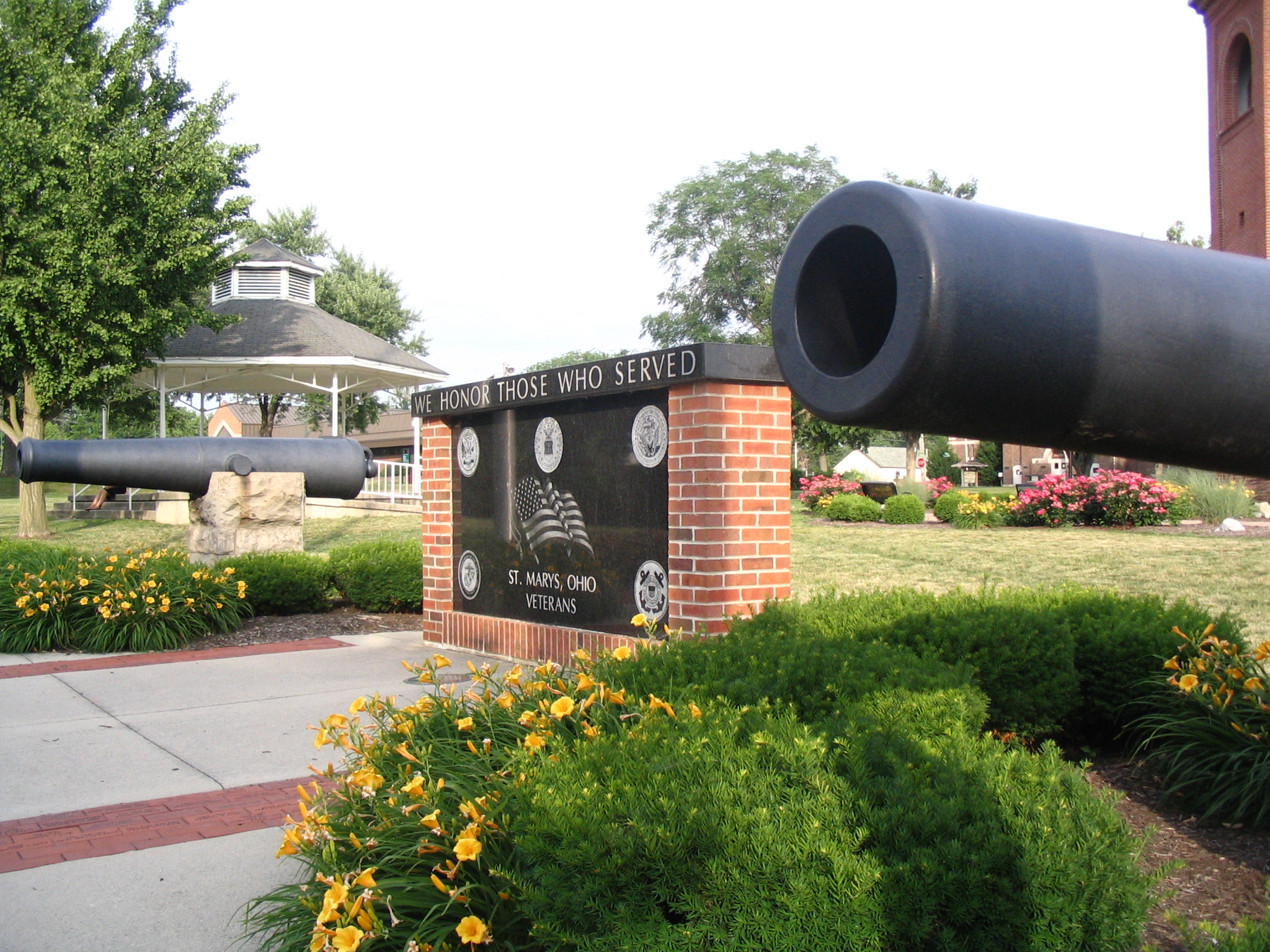
Memorial wall and twin cannons at Memorial Park in St. Marys, Ohio.

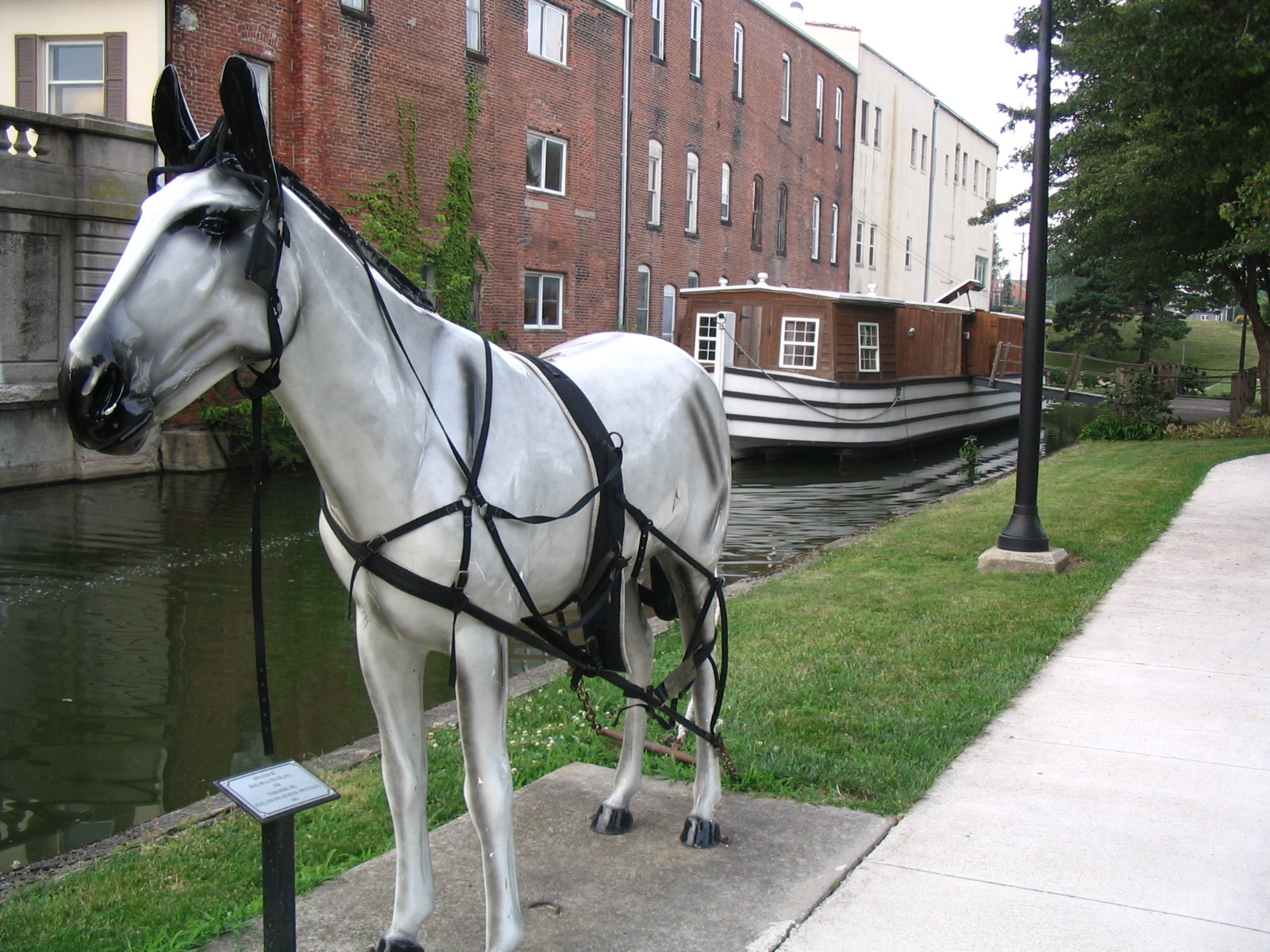
Canal boat exhibit at Memorial Park. Display features a life-sized metal horse tethered to a restored canal boat on the Miami-Erie Canal.

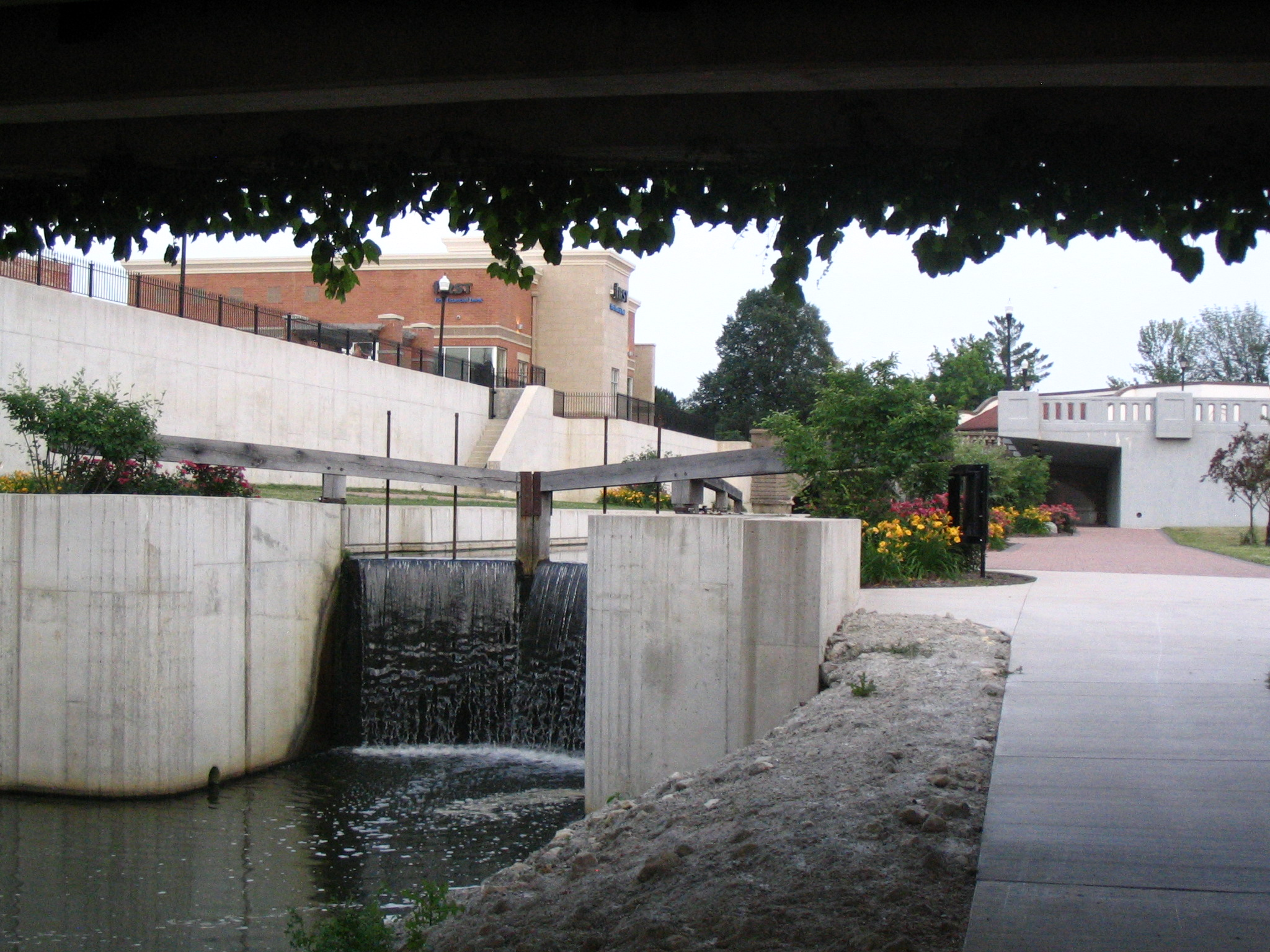
The recently restored Lock 13 in St. Marys, Ohio. Lock 13 is one of many locks along the Miami-Erie Canal.

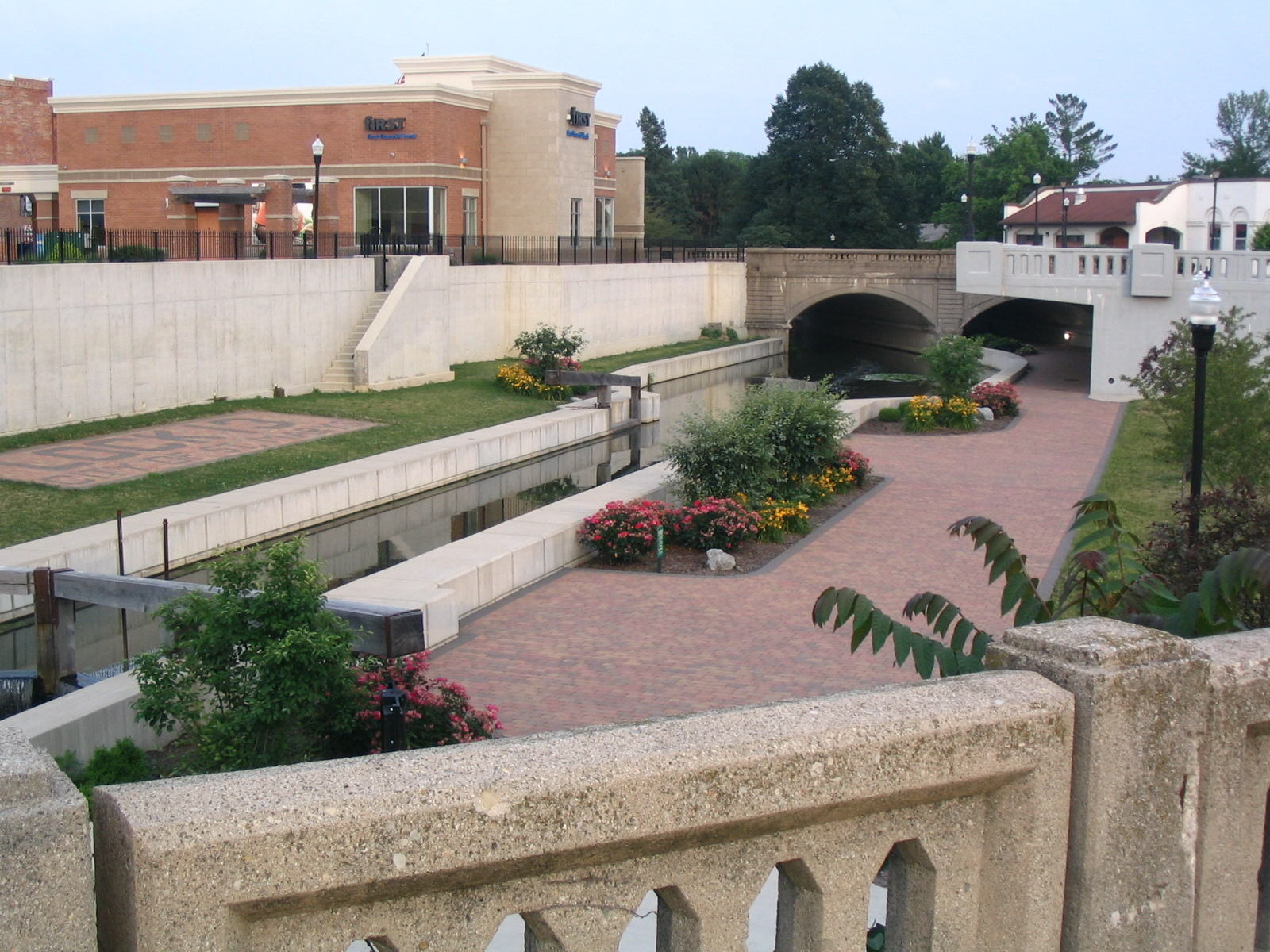
The newly restored Lock 13 area in the middle of downtown St. Marys.

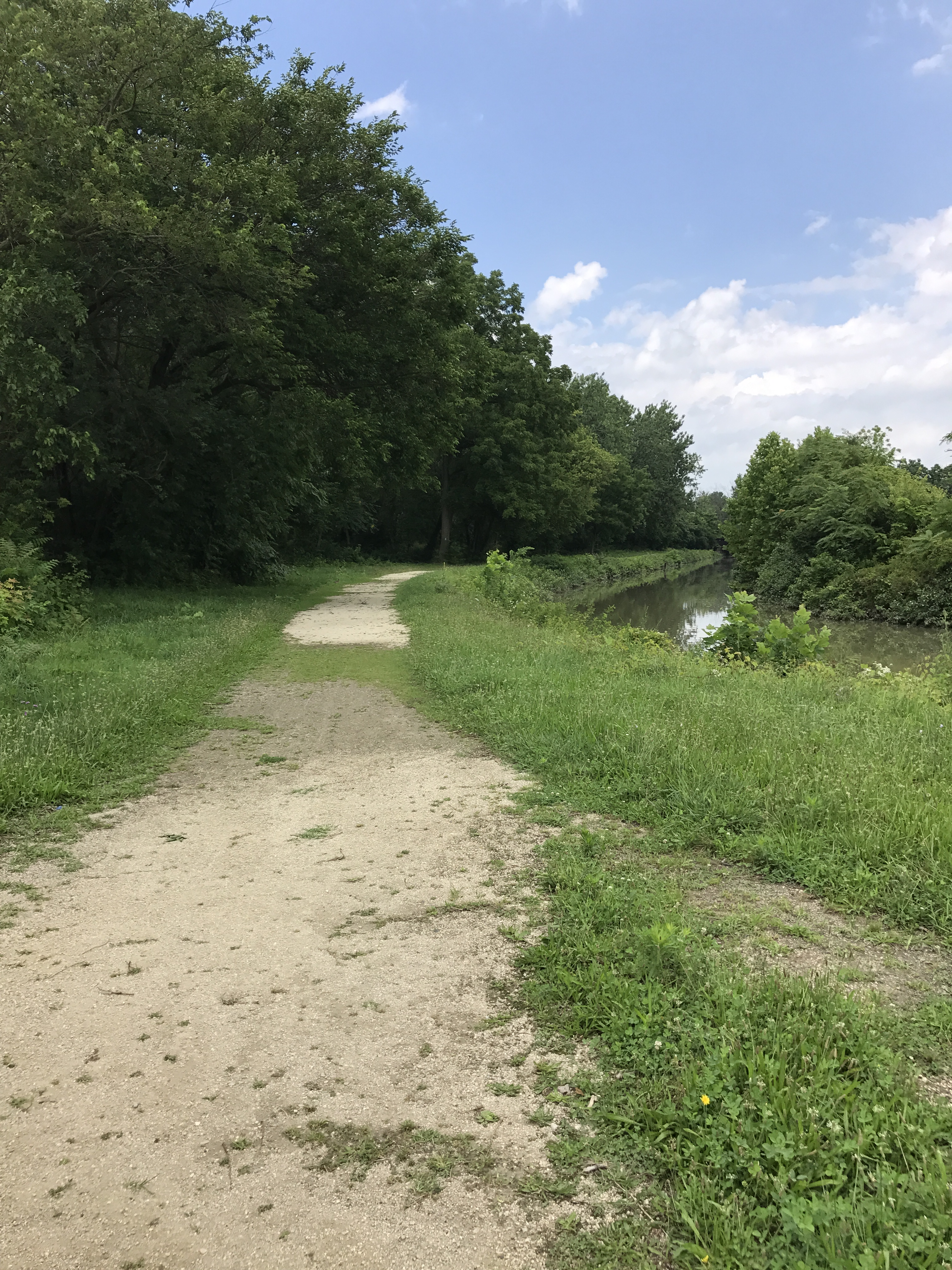
Beginning of the Carl Chiles Walk Path near Lock 13 and Memorial Park in St. Marys. This path runs along the Miami-Erie Canal.
