= Matthew Doherty (homelessness official) =

American nonprofit administrator

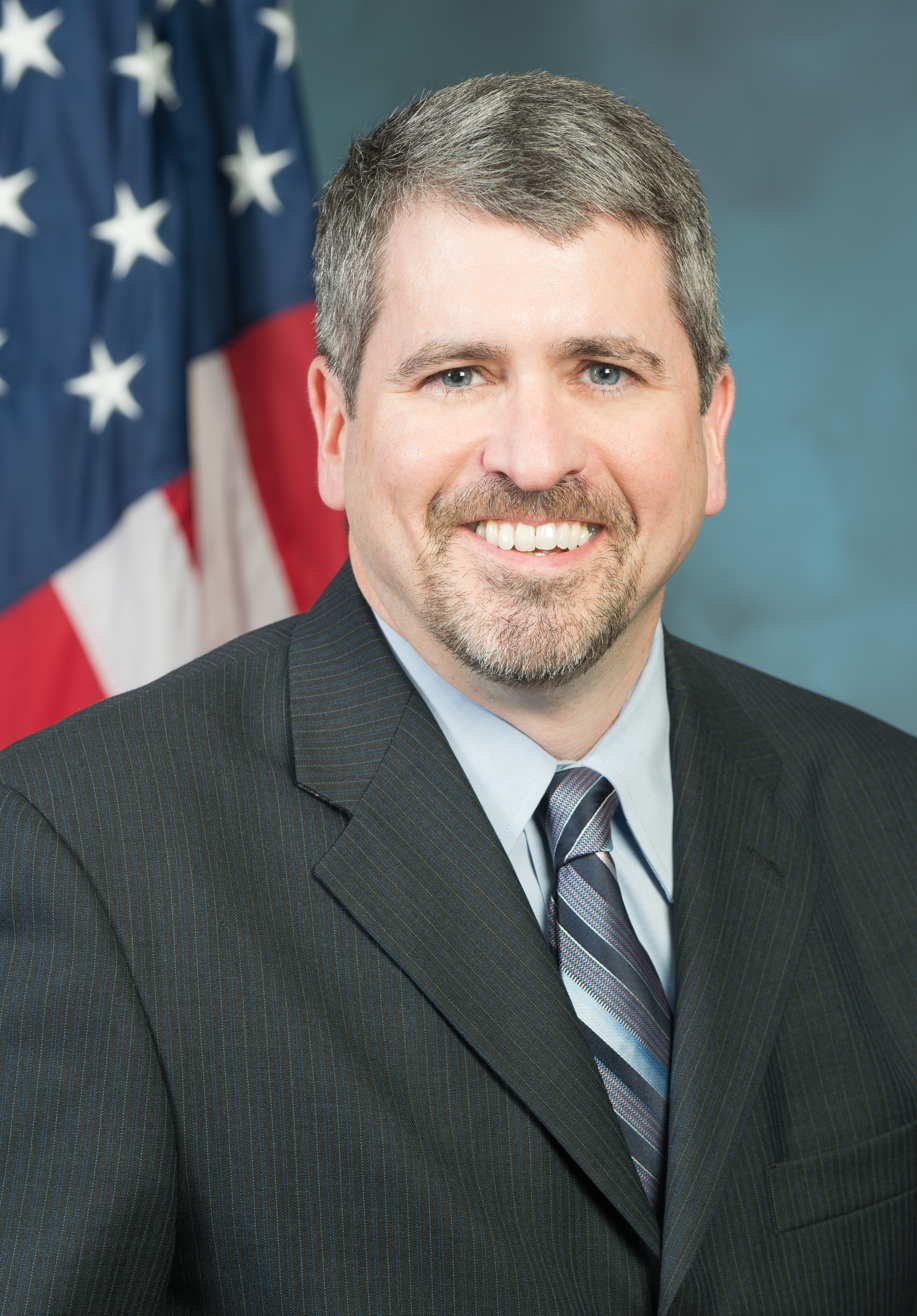

Executive director, United States Interagency Council on Homelessness
- In office 2015–2019

Matthew Doherty is a homelessness consultant who is former executive director of the United States Interagency Council on Homelessness. He currently advises the state of California and the city of Austin, Texas. He is a proponent of the "Housing First" model, which prioritizes finding private housing for homeless people instead of shelters.

== Political career ==
Doherty worked at the Corporation for Supportive Housing; the San Diego Housing Commission in California; and the King County Housing Authority of Washington state.

=== U.S. Interagency Council on Homelessness ===
Doherty joined the United States Interagency Council on Homelessness in 2012. In 2015, he was appointed by President Barack Obama to lead the council, making him the top homelessness official in the United States.

Doherty advised cities against forcibly dispersing camps of homeless people, which he said jeopardized "the ability to engage and develop trusting relationships to help them on paths to permanent housing."

Doherty continued to serve through the Trump administration until he was fired in November 2019, as the administration prepared a crackdown on homelessness in California.

=== Consulting ===
In December 2019, Doherty was hired by Governor Gavin Newsom of California as an advisor on homelessness.

In February 2020, he was hired as a consultant by the city of Austin, Texas.

== See also ==
- Homelessness in the United States
- Homelessness in the United States by state
- Housing First
