= 100,000 Homes Campaign =

Campaign against homelessness in the United States

The 100,000 Homes Campaign was an initiative of Community Solutions designed to "help communities around the country place 100,000 chronically homeless people in 186 communities in the United States into permanent supportive housing." Due to the cost of emergency department treatment, the program aims to provide housing for the homeless, as it is cheaper in the long run. In 2014, the program was featured on 60 Minutes, focusing on the homeless population in Nashville, Tennessee. Becky Kanis Margiotta was the campaign director. By July 2014, the 100,000 Homes Campaign had reached its goal and housed 105,580 of the most vulnerable homeless individuals.

== Housing First ==
One of the vehicles focusing on housing the chronically homeless is Housing First which is premised on the notion that housing is a basic human right, and so should not be denied to anyone, even if they are abusing alcohol or other substances. The Housing First model, thus, is philosophically in contrast to models that require the homeless to abjure substance-abuse and seek treatment in exchange for housing. Housing First is currently endorsed by the United States Interagency Council on Homelessness (USICH) as a "best practice" for governments and service-agencies to use in their fight to end chronic homelessness in America.

== Name and Need and Vulnerability Index ==
Journalist David Bornstein of The New York Times summarized key elements of the 100,000 Homes Campaign that campaign leaders indicate are critical to its success. This included learning individual homeless people's "name and need" by mobilizing volunteers to go very early in the morning to check on them, establishing a "vulnerability index" so they could prioritize certain homeless people and "bring housing advocates and agency representatives together to streamline the placement processes, and share ideas about how to cut through red tape."
