= Rapid Re-Housing =

Social housing policy

Rapid Re-Housing is a relatively recent innovation in social policy that is an intervention designed to help those who are homeless. As described by the National Alliance to End Homelessness, Rapid Re-Housing is a subset of the Housing First approach to end homelessness. While many Housing First programs provide rental assistance, or help clients to access rent subsidies, Rapid Re-Housing programs always provide short-term rental assistance and services, with services ending once rental assistance terminates. As with the Housing First approach, the goals are to help people obtain housing quickly, increase self-sufficiency, and remain housed. The Core Components of rapid re-housing—housing identification, rent and move-in assistance, and case management and services-operationalize Housing First principles. While Housing First programs often serve many different target populations, including youth, families with children, and the chronically homeless, Rapid Re-Housing programs generally target people with low to moderate services needs. Housing First is much broader in its approach, with program designs developed to be flexible and responsive to the complexity of human needs.

== General principles ==
Similar to Housing First, Rapid Re-Housing is concerned with helping persons who are homeless move quickly into housing, thus minimizing the time they spend being homeless. Traditional homeless services have typically required homeless persons to move into transitional housing, wherein they participate in a program designed to make them "ready for housing" (such as participate in a 12 step program). Once they have completed the transitional housing program, they are assisted in moving into permanent housing. In some jurisdictions, these programs take place in homeless shelters, not transitional housing.

Rapid Re-Housing is based on evidence that indicates that individuals and families have better outcomes if they spend more time in permanent housing. Thus, Rapid Re-Housing concentrates on assisting homeless persons move into permanent housing before any programs are delivered.

== Differences between Housing First and Rapid Re-Housing ==
As described by the National Alliance to End Homelessness, Rapid Re-Housing is a subset of the Housing First approach to end homelessness. Rapid Re-Housing programs are based upon the "Housing First" approach and the strong evidence base that stable housing promotes improved social and/or economic well-being. Experienced practitioners know that outcomes of services interventions are most successful from a stable permanent housing base. While many Housing First programs provide rental assistance, or help clients to access rent subsidies, the key difference between Rapid Re-Housing and Housing First programs is that Rapid Re-Housing always provides a short-term rent subsidy, the subsidy is time-limited and ends within 3–6 months generally, and services end when the subsidy ends. As with the Housing First approach, the goals are to help people obtain housing quickly, increase self-sufficiency, and remain housed. The Core Components of rapid re-housing — housing identification, rent and move-in assistance, and case management and services - are based upon Housing First principles. While Housing First programs often serve many different target populations, including youth, families with children, and the chronically homeless, Rapid Re-Housing programs generally target people with low to moderate services needs. Housing First is much broader in its approach, with program designs developed to be flexible and responsive to the complexity of human needs.

- Rapid Re-Housing is always time-limited (usually 3–6 months of supports), whereas Housing First programs vary greatly in the length of time that services are available, based upon need. Services for the chronically homeless may be provided for from 12 to 18 months or can be indefinite
- Rapid Re-Housing as promoted by some practitioners is targeted to persons with mid-range acuity, whereas Housing First programs can range from families with low-intensity services needs to those with higher intensity services needs - and when applied to chronic homelessness, programs general serve persons with high acuity and do so in permanent supportive housing.
- Rapid Re-Housing is always delivered through scattered site apartments, whereas Housing First can be delivered through scattered site apartments or congregate living
- Housing First for families with children generally uses classic case management strategies, with intensity of services delivery and home-based case management based upon individualized child and family needs. Housing First for the chronically homeless utilizes Assertive community treatment or Intensive Case Management, whereas Rapid Re-Housing uses neither approach
- Housing First programs for families, including Rapid Re-Housing Programs (rent subsidy is provided but is time-limited), generally utilize time-limited and intensive case management for 3–6 months, to help families stabilize and become connected to community-based resources and services for longer-term needs.

== Levels of supports ==
While many practitioners of Rapid Re-Housing have been operating Housing First-based programs since the 1990s, others are fairly new to the model and prefer to apply fairly strict guidelines to determine who and for how long may be served in Rapid Re-Housing Programs. The following matrix of services needs should be utilized quite flexibly, however, as assessments of acuity conducted during episodes of homelessness often fail to consider the dramatic changes in capacity and stability that occur once homeless individuals and families are assisted in relocating to stable rental housing at rents they can afford.

For practitioners who would like a more targeted approach, the following matrix may be helpful, showing five different levels of supports available in a Rapid Re-Housing Intervention.

Level of assistance	Assistance provided	Barriers to obtaining housing	Barriers to sustaining housing
Level 1	Housing start-up financial assistance; assistance apartment hunting; time-limited rent supplements; check-in after move-in	No criminal history; established local rental history; good credit history with some late payments	Very low income; no savings
Level 2	Housing start-up financial assistance; in-depth assistance apartment hunting including bus or taxi vouchers; time-limited rent supplements; weekly check-ins after move-in for two months; services up to 6 months; 6-month availability if the landlord has problems with the tenant	Minor criminal history such as DUIs; limited rental history; 1-2 explainable evictions; history of late payments	Very low income; no savings; inconsistent employment; poor budgeting skills; depression or anxiety; may have been homeless once before; may have difficulty with personal maintenance/hygiene
Level 3	Housing start-up financial assistance; in-depth assistance apartment hunting including bus or taxi vouchers and including staff accompanying client to meet with landlord; time-limited rent supplements; weekly check-ins after move-in for two months; unannounced drop-in visits; services up to 9 months; 9-month availability if the landlord has problems with the tenant; program may pay for repairs or damages	Some criminal history but no drugs or serious crimes; up to 3 evictions; history of late payments; possible court judgments for debt and/or closed accounts	Very low income; no savings; periods of unemployment; poor budgeting skills; mental health or substance use problems that affect tenancy; may have been homeless more than once before; may have difficulty maintaining apartment; may be domestic violence present
Level 4	Housing start-up financial assistance; in-depth assistance apartment hunting including bus or taxi vouchers and including staff accompanying client to meet with landlord; time-limited rent supplements; weekly check-ins after move-in for two months; unannounced drop-in visits; services up to 12 months; 12-month availability if the landlord has problems with the tenant; program may pay for repairs or damages; monthly check-ins with landlord; program may pay for additional damage deposit prior to move-in	Criminal history may include drugs or crimes against person or property; up to 5 evictions; poor credit history; possible court judgments for debt and/or closed accounts	Extremely low income; no savings; no bank account; periods of unemployment; poor budgeting skills; mental health or substance use problems that affect tenancy; may have been homeless more than once for extended periods of time; may have difficulty maintaining apartment; may be domestic violence present
Level 5	Likely requires experienced staff, consider client for Housing First	Extensive criminal history; multiple evictions; damage to past apartments; complaints from neighbors; multiple court judgments for debt; unpaid debts to landlords; closed accounts	Unable to maintain tenancy; out-of control behavior; active and serious mental health or substance dependency problems; may have been chronically homeless
