= Michael J. L. Kirby =

Canadian politician (born 1941)

The Honourable Michael J. L. Kirby OC

Senator for South Shore, Nova Scotia
- In office 1984–2006
- Appointed by: Pierre Trudeau

Personal details
- Born: August 5, 1941 (age 84) Montreal, Quebec, Canada
- Party: Liberal
- Committees: Chair, Standing Committee on Banking, Trade and Commerce (1994–1999); Chair, Standing Committee on Social Affairs, Science and Technology (1999–2006)

Michael J. L. Kirby OC (born August 5, 1941) is a Canadian politician. He sat in the Senate of Canada as a Liberal representing Nova Scotia. He is the former chair of the Mental Health Commission of Canada.

== Early life and education ==
Born in Montreal, Kirby earned a Bachelor of Science and Master of Arts in mathematics from Dalhousie University where he was a member of Phi Delta Theta fraternity, and, also a Doctor of Philosophy in applied mathematics from Northwestern University.

== Career ==
=== Academia ===
In the 1960s Kirby was a professor of business administration and public administration at Dalhousie and also taught at the University of Chicago and the University of Kent.

=== Politics ===
Kirby worked as principal assistant to the Premier of Nova Scotia Gerald Regan from 1970 to 1973 and Assistant Principal Secretary to Prime Minister Pierre Trudeau from 1974 to 1976. He served as President of the Institute for Research on Public Policy from 1977 to 1980.

Kirby chaired the federal Task Force on Atlantic Fisheries which was established to recommend how to achieve and maintain a viable Atlantic fishing industry. It issued its report in 1982.

Kirby returned to public service in the 1980s as Secretary to the Canadian Cabinet for Federal-Provincial Relations and Deputy Clerk of the Queen's Privy Council for Canada. As such he participated in the federal-provincial negotiations that led to the patriation of the Canadian Constitution in 1982. He was elevated to the Canadian Senate by Pierre Trudeau in January 1984 weeks before the prime minister announced his intention to retire. Kirby was the principal author of a 2002 report by the committee on Canada's health care system. The report urged greater private sector involvement in health care delivery and was seen as a rival to the royal commission report on health care released by Roy Romanow. Kirby was criticised for having a conflict of interest in his role in writing the report due to his service on the boards of directors of various private health care companies.

On August 15, 2006, Kirby announced his resignation from the Canadian Senate effective on October 31, 2006. His retirement came nearly a decade before his mandatory retirement in August 2016.

=== Private sector ===
He remained active in the private sector serving as vice-president of Goldfarb Consultants from 1984 to 1994 at a period when the polling firm was often employed by the Liberal Party of Canada. Kirby also served as a backroom advisor to the Liberals and frequently appeared on television as a political pundit during the 1980s and 1990s.

In 2001, Kirby joined Chapters' board of directors.

=== Mental health work ===
In 2007, he was asked by Prime Minister Stephen Harper to become the first chair of the newly created Mental Health Commission of Canada, a not-for-profit organization that was created in response to his 2003 Senate report on mental health.

Kirby founded Partners for Mental Health and served as its first chair. The organization closed in 2017.

== Honours ==
In 2008, he was made an Officer of the Order of Canada.

== Archives ==
There is a Michael Kirby fonds at Library and Archives Canada.
