= Partners for Mental Health =

Canadian charitable organization

Partners for Mental Health (PFMH) was a Canadian charitable organization that was active between 2012 and 2017. PFMH was formed in support of the Framework for a Mental Health Strategy for Canada, issued by the Mental Health Commission of Canada in 2009. The framework contained eight goals, including one to establish a broadly based social movement to drive change in mental health in Canada, which became PFMH's mandate. With the initiatives of PFMH now transferred to the Canadian Mental Health Association and Jack.org, PFMH's operations have been closed as of 2017.

== Activities ==
PFMH was founded by Michael J.L. Kirby as the Partners for Mental Health Foundation under the auspices of the Mental Health Commission of Canada. Kirby was the first chairperson of PFMH and was its founding chair until it completed its mandate and closed its operations in 2017.

Partners for Mental Health became a registered charity in Canada in November 2010. On April 2, 2012, it launched its first public engagement campaign, Not Myself Today, and officially began operating independently of the Mental Health Commission of Canada. Partners for Mental Health was accredited by Imagine Canada.

In October 2013, PFMH launched the PFMH's Right By You youth mental health campaign, focused on improving access to mental health-related services, treatment and support for children and youth, as well as on the establishment of a dedicated national youth suicide prevention fund.

Not Myself Today was the first initiative created by Partners for Mental Health. Originally launched in April 2012 as a broad engagement campaign for all Canadians, Not Myself Today was refocused on workplace mental health in May 2013, and the program was transferred to the Canadian Mental Health Association in 2017.

While active, Partners for Mental Health won two awards: it was one of 10 charities worldwide to win a Project for Awesome 2014 award, and its Right By You campaign video/PSA won the Best Nonprofit Video in the 2014 DoGooder Video Awards.
