= Community Action Projects Ltd (Manchester, 1971–2005) =

Charity in Manchester, England

Community Action Projects Ltd (commonly known as CAP) was an unstaffed voluntary organisation and registered charity based in Manchester, England, which pioneered low-cost, community-based housing models for people leaving psychiatric institutions and for young homeless people. Active from 1971 to 2005, the group developed what would later be recognised as a housing first approach to homelessness, predating the formal articulation of that concept in North America in the 1990s. CAP published its methods widely to influence larger social housing providers, and its model of volunteer-run emergency overnight accommodation — originally called "Crash Houses" and later renamed "Night Stop" — anticipated the Nightstop network that was formally established in Leeds in 1987.

== History ==
=== Origins and founding ===
Community Action Projects Ltd was incorporated on 24 November 1971 (company number 01032323) and registered as a charity on 16 March 1972 (charity number 263747). The organisation was created by a group of volunteers associated with the Community Action movement at the University of Manchester.

The founders were motivated by the lack of after-care facilities — particularly accommodation — for former psychiatric patients at a time when the United Kingdom was beginning to pursue a policy of deinstitutionalisation, moving patients out of long-stay psychiatric hospitals and into community settings. The group's 1982 publication Beyond the Hostel recorded that CAP set up what it described as Manchester's first group homes, initially consisting of two adjoining houses rented from a commercial landlord and accommodating eight people. Crucially, the scheme was financially self-sufficient: rental income covered all expenses and there were no paid staff.

=== Charitable aims ===
CAP's registered charitable purpose was "to provide housing, living accommodation and associated amenities anywhere in the United Kingdom … for persons in necessitous circumstances, including persons in receipt of or in need of psychiatric or medical treatment and persons who for any reason are unable to maintain themselves without supportive care, and to promote, aid and further rehabilitation of such persons in the community and their welfare generally."

=== Projects ===
CAP operated a series of small-scale housing projects across south Manchester and Salford over a period of roughly fifteen years:

Bowker Street, Salford (1973–1975) — The first group home project, established in partnership with Family Housing Association (Manchester) in empty properties that were awaiting a Housing Action Area regeneration programme. The project ran for approximately 30 months.

Egerton Street, Fallowfield (1974–c.1986) — A permanent supported housing project comprising seven studio flats (bedsits), including one designated for a resident caretaker. This was CAP's longest-running project, where the landlord was Family Housing Association (Manchester).

Hartington Street (from 1977) — The first "Crashpad" in CAP's overnight rota project, offering peppercorn rents to tenants in a property awaiting regeneration. This project introduced the emergency accommodation model that would become the group's most influential innovation.

Stamford Street (from 1981) — A "Crash House" project representing an advance on earlier schemes in that it was the first to operate from an improved property with a long-term tenancy, rather than one earmarked for demolition or refurbishment.

Cromwell Road (from 1982) — A further housing project.

=== The Crash House / Night Stop model ===
The emergency overnight accommodation model, initially called "Crash Houses," involved volunteers providing spare rooms in community properties to homeless young people on an overnight rota basis. Around 1985, the project was renamed "Night Stop." This community-hosted model of emergency accommodation for young homeless people predated the establishment of the first formal Nightstop scheme, which was launched in Leeds in 1987 by Barnardo's Church and Community Action. The Nightstop concept subsequently grew into a UK-wide network of more than 30 local schemes, coordinated by Depaul UK.

=== Relationship to Housing First ===
CAP's approach — providing unconditional, low-cost housing as a first step, without requiring residents to demonstrate "housing readiness" or to progress through a staircase of hostels and supported accommodation — closely resembles what is now internationally recognised as the Housing First model. The formal Housing First concept originated in North American policy discussions in the 1990s, notably through the Pathways to Housing programme established by Sam Tsemberis in New York City in 1992. CAP's earlier, independently developed work in Manchester during the 1970s and 1980s thus represents a significant but largely unrecognised British precursor to the Housing First approach, apart perhaps locally, based on the 1982 report of Manchester City Council's Director of Housing (extract below).

=== Later years and dissolution ===
CAP experienced a change in its volunteer leadership and company directors around 1986. A period of inactivity followed, with the previous committee reforming in 1990 after a lapse in company functions. The organisation was eventually wound up: a voluntary application to dissolve the company was made on 22 March 2005, and CAP Ltd was formally dissolved on 16 August 2005. The charity registration was removed on 14 April 2005.

== Publications ==
CAP and its associates produced several publications documenting their methods and findings, intended to influence policy and practice among larger housing providers:

- Housing Schemes for Homeless Young People (Community Action Projects, 1977)
- Borderlines: A Partial View of Detached Work with Homeless Young People by Alistair and Gabrielle Cox (1977)
- Beyond the Hostel: Housing for Homeless Young People — A Youth Work Approach (1982)
- Crash Houses (Community Action Projects, 1983)
- Young Homeless People Action Sheet ×4 issues (Community Action Projects Manchester, 1993–1994)

== Significance ==
Community Action Projects Ltd is notable for several reasons within the history of homelessness policy in the United Kingdom. It demonstrated that very small, entirely volunteer-run, financially self-sustaining housing schemes could provide effective alternatives to institutional care for former psychiatric patients and to hostel-based accommodation for homeless young people.

In 1982 the Director of Housing wrote a report for Manchester City Council proposing a Strategy for the Housing of Single People in Need. This report included a description of CAP's Egerton Road project as follows:

"3.02 Family Housing Association (FHA) and Community Action Projects (CAP) set up a house approximately 8 years ago for 6 young people with problems in addition to homelessness. A warden / caretaker lives in rent free. The house is divided into six self-contained 1 bedroomed flatlets. FHA manages the property and collects the rent, CAP refers tenants and provides some follow-up together with the caring role of the warden / caretaker. The project has operated successfully for 8 years, providing a relatively independent home for many young people who as a result have become better able to cope with the problems of living alone. Over the years there have been rent arrears problems but these have been successfully overcome, by the co-operation between FHA and CAP. It is clear that the success of such projects depends on the same level of co-operation between the housing manager and the referral / follow up agency as achieved with this project, together with a high level of motivation from both.

3.03 Specific lessons may be learned from the above scheme.

1. The bedsits are self-contained and for one person, thus eliminating the problems associated with sharing.

2. Each young person is a tenant with all the appropriate rights due to her / him.

3. Services are separately metered for each bedsit.

4. The project has received intensive and careful management from the landlord.

5. Follow-up work by the referral agency CAP has been extensive.

6. A caring carętaker / warder lives on the premises and is available to the tenants.

7. The running cost of the project are low.

Clearly it is possible for such schemes to operate successfully. The Housing Department could investigate managing similar schemes or assisting Housing Associations to do the same."

Also, the CAP's "Crash House" model of community-hosted emergency overnight accommodation anticipated what became the nationwide Nightstop network. Its broader philosophy of providing housing as the first intervention, rather than as a reward for achieving stability through other support services, prefigured the Housing First approach that has since become a cornerstone of homelessness policy across the Western world.

== See also ==
- Housing First
- Deinstitutionalisation
- Care in the Community
- Homelessness in the United Kingdom
