= Housing First =

Providing permanent housing as a policy against homelessness

Housing First is a policy that prioritizes providing unconditional and permanent housing as quickly as possible to homeless people, which acts as the foundation for other supportive services. It was first discussed in the 1990s, and in the following decades became government policy in certain locations within the Western world. There is a substantial base of evidence showing that Housing First is both an effective solution to homelessness and a form of cost savings, as it also reduces the use of public services like hospitals, jails, and emergency shelters. Cities like Helsinki and Vienna in Europe have seen dramatic reductions in homelessness due to the adaptation of Housing First policies, as have the North American cities Columbus, Ohio, Salt Lake City, Utah, and Medicine Hat, Alberta.

Housing First is an alternative to a system of emergency shelter/transitional housing progressions which characterize the Continuum of Care and staircase housing models. Rather than moving homeless individuals through different "levels" of housing, whereby each level moves them closer to "independent housing" (for example: from the streets to a public shelter, and from a public shelter to a transitional housing program, and from there to their own apartment or house in the community), Housing First moves the homeless individual or household immediately from the streets or homeless shelters into their own accommodation.

Housing First approaches are based on the concept that a homeless individual or household's first and primary need is to obtain stable housing, and that other issues that may affect the household can and should be addressed once housing is obtained. In contrast, many other programs operate from a model of "housing readiness" — that is, that an individual or household must address other issues that may have led to the episode of homelessness prior to entering housing.

The Housing First strategy is a comprehensive solution incorporating support for homeless people in all aspects of their personal and social life. It does not intend to provide housing for the people in need and forget about them. The Housing First philosophy is a paradigm shift, where quick provision of stable accommodations is a precondition for any other treatment to reduce homelessness. Meanwhile, this approach relies on layers of collaborative support networks that promote stability and eliminate factors that cause or prolong homelessness. The support system addresses social and structural issues such as healthcare, education, family, children, employment, and social welfare. Evidence from Housing First implementation in Finland has shown it to result in significant cost savings.

== General principles ==
According to the USICH "Housing First is a proven approach, applicable across all elements of systems for ending homelessness, in which people experiencing homelessness are connected to permanent housing swiftly and with few to no treatment preconditions, behavioral contingencies, or other barriers."

== History ==
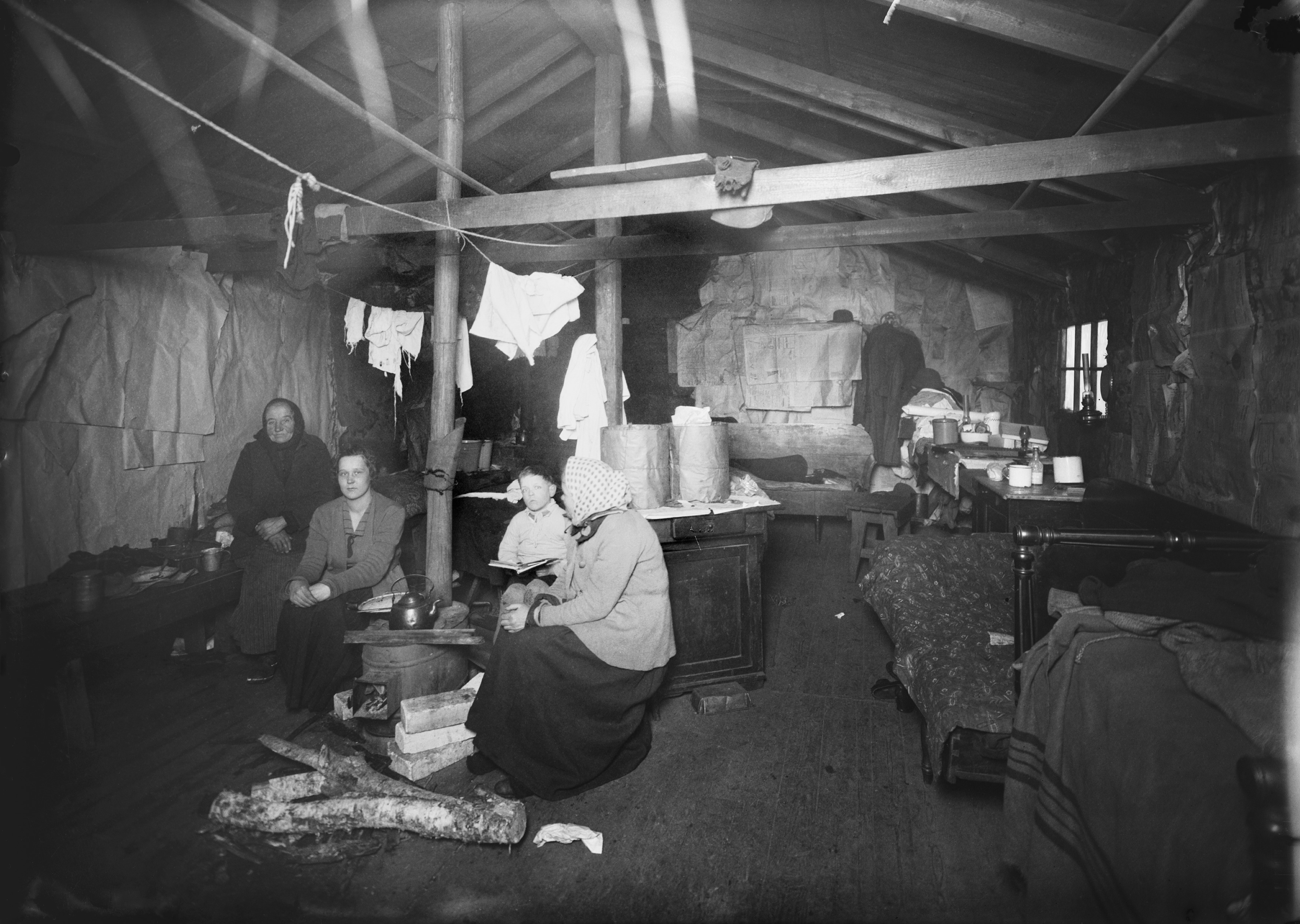
Temporary housing for those evicted from their apartments in Sörnäinen, Helsinki, Finland in 1924

In the late 19th century, Don Bosco pioneered both the concept that would later become known as Housing First in Italy as well as pioneering the concept that would provide Dorothy Day the basis for her Catholic Worker Movement House of Hospitality founded in 1933. Bosco himself was inspired by and created a need society based on the teachings of St. Francis de Sales, a 16th and 17th century clergyman who was also at the forefront of early movements insisting that basic needs of the people be met first without various rules and regulations.

The formal Housing First Model has its origins in "Supported Housing" implemented in North America during the 1990s. For many years, the conventional action taken in regard to people experiencing homelessness was that of psychiatric hospitalization, where doctors considered individuals diagnosed with severe mental illness incapable of functioning in all areas of life and that they required around-the-clock supervision and support. This also reflected the idea prevalent at the time that all or a vast majority of people experiencing homelessness were suffering from mental illnesses. However, by the 1980s, experts began to raise questions regarding the underlying assumptions of this approach.

In response, a "staircase" approach began to be utilized. The staircase approach for people experiencing homelessness had three goals: training people to live in their own homes after being on the streets or in and out of hospitals; making sure someone was receiving treatment and medication for any ongoing mental health problems; and making sure someone was not involved in behavior that might put their health, well-being, and housing stability at risk, particularly that they were not utilizing drugs or alcohol. Permanent housing was seen as the end goal of the program. This model is similar to the Continuum of Care model for homelessness prevention, a model that has widely been used in the US.

This model had several flaws. Those served by the staircase model often became "stuck" in staircase services, because they could not always manage to complete all the tasks necessary to proceed. Participants were often evicted from housing due to failure to abstain from drugs and alcohol and refusing to undergo psychiatric treatment. Programs also had high levels of standards beyond those expected from a "typical citizen" - participants were expected to be the "perfect citizen" in order to continue.

Supported housing services developed as an alternative to staircase services for psychiatric patients. In contrast to the staircase approach, former psychiatric patients were very quickly provided with ordinary housing and received flexible help and treatment from mobile support teams. Support was provided for as long as was needed. Importantly, supportive housing did not require individuals to abstain from drugs or alcohol and providers did not expect full engagement with treatment as a condition for being housed.

Building on the supported housing model, but applied to people experiencing homelessness, Housing First was developed by Sam Tsemberis, a faculty member of the Department of Psychiatry of the New York University School of Medicine. Housing was provided 'first' rather than, as in the staircase model, 'last'. Housing First offered rapid access to a settled home in the community, combined with mobile support services that visited people in their own homes. There was no requirement to stop drinking or using drugs and no requirement to accept treatment in return for housing. Housing was not removed from someone if their drug or alcohol use did not stop, or if they refused to comply with treatment. If a person's behavior or support needs resulted in a loss of housing, Housing First would help them find another place to live and then continue to support them for as long as was needed. Tsemberis founded Pathways to Housing in New York City in 1992 to implement this model.

The Housing First model was also being developed independently outside the USA. One notable published example was Community Action Projects Ltd (CAP Ltd) in Manchester, UK, formed in 1971 as a non-profit limited liability company and charity, and disbanded in 2005. CAP Ltd was an unstaffed community group which pioneered rights-based projects for homeless people with additional needs, including projects for people leaving mental healthcare hospitals and for young homeless people. The method and lessons were adapted in the 1980s by other groups in Manchester including for street homeless people in poor health due to severe alcohol misuse. The group used low-cost publications to share their findings, aiming to influence mainstream social housing providers.

Research conducted in the late 1990s by pioneering American social researcher Dennis P. Culhane and others demonstrated that the housing first model was more effective at ending long-term homelessness than previous models of care. The systemic use of comparative research demonstrated the model's effectiveness. The first comprehensive meta analysis to compare types of accommodation-based interventions for people experiencing homelessness and their impact on housing stability, conducted by the Campbell Collaboration and commissioned by the Centre for Homelessness, found that programmes such as Housing First result in significantly better housing stability than models with less or no tailored support. These findings were based on a review of 28 studies covering 51 accommodation interventions, and involving 8,390 participants.

== Definition ==
Housing First for the chronically homeless is premised on the notion that housing is a basic human right, and so should not be denied to anyone, even if they are using alcohol or other substances. The Housing First model, thus, is philosophically in contrast to models that require the homeless to abjure substance-abuse and seek treatment in exchange for housing. This includes 'Treatment first' models, which provide temporary housing while addressing mental, physical and substance use needs, but only offer permanent housing on the condition that treatment plans are adhered to.

Housing First, when supported by the United States Department of Housing and Urban Development, does not only provide housing. The model, used by nonprofit agencies throughout America, also provides wraparound case management services to the tenants, without the precondition of sobriety. This case management provides stability for homeless individuals, which increases their success. It allows for accountability and promotes self-sufficiency. The housing provided through government supported Housing First programs is permanent and "affordable," meaning that tenants pay 30% of their income towards rent. Housing First, as pioneered by Pathways to Housing, targets individuals with disabilities. This housing is supported through two HUD programs. They are the Supportive Housing Program and the Shelter Plus Care Program. The Housing First approach has also been tailored by housing agencies to meet the needs of survivors of domestic violence who are experiencing homelessness.

== Execution ==
The Housing First Model is executed through either a scattered-site or project-based implementation. A scattered-site Housing First program is a model in which residents are offered the opportunity of being housed in individual housing units throughout a community. This model integrates participants in a community as opposed to assembling multiple or all participants in one project or location. In a project-based Housing First implementation, residents are offered units within a single housing project or site. This model congregates multiple or all participants in one locality. In both the scattered-site and project-based Housing First programs, residents are given access to a wide variety of supportive health and rehabilitation services which they have the option, although not mandatory, to participate in and receive treatment.

Weekly staff visits as well as a normal lease agreement are also a part of the program. Consumers have to pay 30 percent of their income every month as rent. Rather than have a homeless person remain in an emergency homeless shelter, it was thought to be better to quickly get the person permanent housing of some sort and the necessary support services to sustain a new home. But there are many complications that must be dealt with to make such an initiative work successfully in the middle to long term.

== Evidence and outcome ==
=== Australia ===
Some housing projects have been shown to produce similar results to the US Housing First model in terms of strong housing outcomes and reductions in intensity and frequency of service use relative to pre-intervention levels.

=== Brazil ===
In 2024, Brazil implemented a program called "Citizen Housing" based on Housing First Principles. Deborah K. Padgett was among the experts who advised the country's Ministry of Human Rights at a summit in late 2023 launching the government's multi-year plan to phase in Housing First nationally.

=== Canada ===
In its Economic Action Plan 2013, the Federal Government of Canada proposed $119 million annually from March 2014 until March 2019—with $600 million in new funding—to renew its Homelessness Partnering Strategy (HPS). In dealing with homelessness in Canada, the focus is on the Housing First model. Thus, private or public organizations across Canada are eligible to receive HPS subsidies to implement Housing First programs. In 2008, the Federal Government of Canada funded a five-year demonstration program, the At Home/Chez Soi project, aimed at providing evidence about what services and systems best help people experiencing serious mental illness and homelessness. Launched in November 2009 and ending in March 2013, the At Home/Chez Soi project was actively addressing the housing need by offering Housing First programs to people with mental illness who were experiencing homelessness in five cities: Vancouver, Winnipeg, Toronto, Montréal and Moncton. In total, At Home/Chez Soi has provided more than 1,000 Canadians with housing.

Sue Fortune, Director of Alex Pathways to Housing in Calgary in her 2013 presentation entitled "Canadian Adaptations using Housing First: A Canadian Perspective" argued that less than 1% of existing clients return to shelters or rough sleeping; clients spend 76% fewer days in jail; clients have 35% decline in police interactions. Fortune reported that the Housing First approach resulted in a 66 percent decline in days hospitalized (from one year prior to intake compared to one year in the program), a 38 percent decline in times in emergency room, a 41 percent decline in EMS events, a 79 percent decline in days in jail and a 30 percent decline in police interactions.

Pathways to Housing Canada describes the Housing First as a "client-driven strategy that provides immediate access to an apartment without requiring initial participation in psychiatric treatment or treatment for sobriety."

Following the development of several Housing First programs through the Home/Chez Soi research project, an initiative to provide Housing First training and technical assistance was created and has been shown to be useful in developing high fidelity programs.

When comparing the effects of Housing First on homeless adults with lower or borderline intellectual functioning to homeless adults with normal intellectual functioning it has been shown that there is no significant difference.

=== Czech Republic ===
In Czech Republic the first pilot Housing First project started in May 2016. 50 families were taken into municipal flats in Brno. NGO IQ Roma Servis supported them for next two years. More than 80% of the families were able to sustain in the flats. This project won SozialMarie - international prize for the best social innovation project.

In 2017 another project started in Brno. This time the target people group was long term homeless singles and the project is run by the municipality. The program supports 65 tenants in municipal flats.

In 2019 Czech government and EU supported 13 new Housing First projects across the country by European Social Fund.

In 2024 there are already 24 Housing First projects in Czech Republic.

=== Denmark ===
In Denmark, Housing First is embedded in the national Homeless Strategy as the overall strategy. However, it has been shown that this intervention strategy is serving only a small number of people recorded to be homeless which is most likely due to barriers like shortage of affordable housing.

=== Finland ===
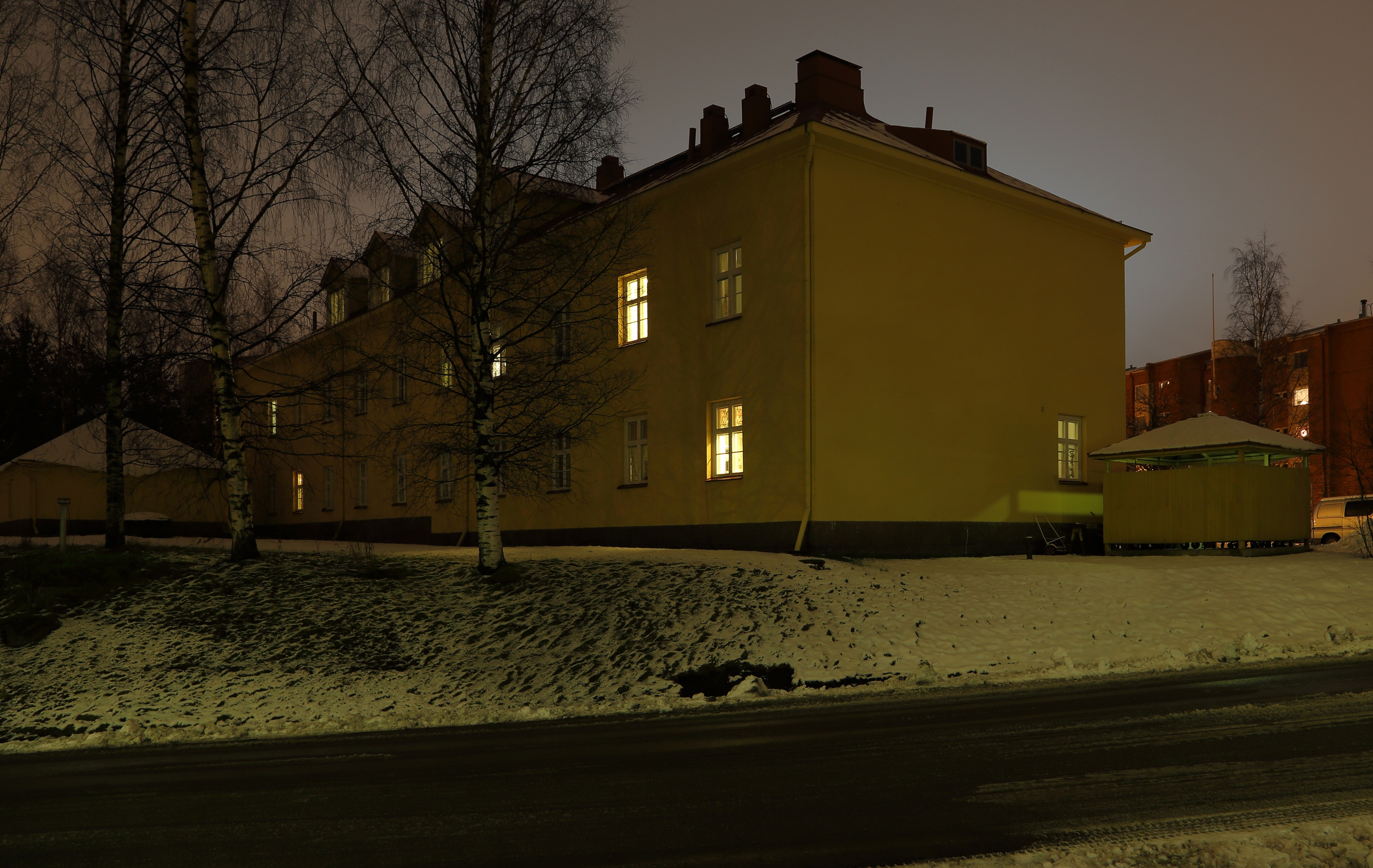
The Kenttätie homeless shelter and a service center in Myllytulli, Oulu

In 2007 the centre-right government of Matti Vanhanen began a special program of four wise men to eliminate homelessness in Finland by 2015.

The programme to reduce long-term homelessness targets just some homeless people. Assessed on the basis of social, health and financial circumstances, this is the hard core of homelessness. The programme to reduce long-term homelessness focuses on the 10 biggest urban growth centres, where most of the homeless are to be found. The main priority, however, is the Helsinki Metropolitan Area, and especially Helsinki itself, where long-term homelessness is concentrated.

The programme is structured around the housing first principle. Solutions to social and health problems cannot be a condition for organising accommodation: on the contrary, accommodation is a requirement which also allows other problems of people who have been homeless to be solved. Having somewhere to live makes it possible to strengthen life management skills and is conducive to purposeful activity.

Because of all the reasons there are for long-term homelessness, if it is to be cut there need to be simultaneous measures at different levels, i.e. universal housing and social policy measures, the prevention of homelessness and targeted action to reduce long-term homelessness.

The programme's objectives are:

- To halve long-term homelessness by 2011
- To eliminate homelessness entirely by 2015
- More effective measures to prevent homelessness

Analysis of Housing First in Tampere, Finland found that it saved €250,000 in one year.

A study of Finland's Housing First program found that giving a homeless person a home and support resulted in cost savings for the society of at least €15,000 per person per year, with potentially even higher cost savings in the long term.

=== France ===
The French government launched a Housing First-like program in 2010 in four major cities — Toulouse, Marseille, Lille and Paris — called "Un chez-Soi d'abord", focused on homeless people with mental illness or addictions. The plan is on a three-year basis for each individual, living in accommodation provided by an NGO. Clients are given help with social issues and medical care. The first houses have been working in three cities since 2011 and a hundred apartments were planned in Paris starting in May 2012. Several NGOs provide rental management and social support for tenants. Those NGOs are linked with scientists investigating the results. The lead team of "Un chez-soi d'abord" is expecting results to be published around 2017.

=== Japan ===
Though homeless support groups like non-profit organization Moyai, Bigissue, Médecins du Monde Japan have requested Housing First, Japanese government does not have a Housing First program yet. Traditionally, the government offers public housing (so-called Koei-jutaku) for low-income people by public housing law, run by local government. Rent fees are adjusted according to household income. Because applicants must be selected by lottery, low-income people are not guaranteed to be chosen to live in the housing, although they have an advantage. There are a couple of Housing First-like programs. Some renovate discarded or empty homes and they rent the rooms to single mothers with financial and occupational support.

=== United Kingdom ===
Community Action Projects Ltd (CAP Ltd, 1971-2005) in Manchester from the 1970s onwards pioneered small-scale rights-based projects for homeless people with additional needs, including projects for people leaving mental healthcare hospitals and for young homeless people. The method and lessons were adapted in the 1980s by other groups in Manchester including for street homeless people in poor health due to severe alcohol misuse. CAP published its findings, including the book Beyond the Hostel in 1982.

In 2017, the U.K. government announced plans for a Housing First pilot programme in the West Midlands, Liverpool, and Manchester, along with funding of £28m. This followed publication of a report entitled Housing First by the Centre for Social Justice which cited the results from the Finnish application of Housing First. The pilots went ahead from 2019 to 2022. Across the three city regions they provided housing and support for 1,061 individuals who were experiencing homelessness and had multiple support needs. An evaluation published by the UK government in 2024. It found that the "vast majority" had successfully sustained their tenancies. Other positive outcomes recorded were falls in reported loneliness, higher social connectedness, enhanced feelings of safely, lower likelihood of being a victim of crime, lower levels of engagement with the criminal justice system and anti-social behaviour. There was, however, less evidence of other quantifiable change in outcomes such as reduced substance use or stronger engagement with employment or training. Qualitative findings from interviews with clients and stakeholders very positive. The evaluation also noted a number of challenges, notably limited supply of appropriate affordable properties, poor understanding of Housing First principles amongst some stakeholders, extremely limited availability of mental health provision, and uncertainty regarding the long-term sustainably of funding for the pilots.

=== United States ===
In August 2007, the US Department of Housing and Urban Development reported that the number of chronically homeless individuals living on the streets or in shelters dropped by an unprecedented 30 percent, from 175,914 people in 2005 to 123,833 in 2007. This was credited in part to the "housing first" approach; Congress in 1999 directed that HUD spend 30% of its funding on the method. In 2013, the estimated national public cost of chronic homelessness was between $3.7 and $4.7 billion according to the United States Interagency Council on Homelessness (USICH). Through Housing First programs, chronically homeless individuals are using fewer hospital resources, spending less time in costly incarceration and requiring fewer emergency room visits. The implementation of Housing First philosophy when working with homeless families and young adults has been shown to increase clients' enrollment in public assistance benefits, decrease involvement in the child welfare system, and have very few returning to homelessness.

Research in Seattle, Washington, found that providing housing and support services for homeless alcoholics costs taxpayers less than leaving them on the street, where taxpayer money goes towards police and emergency health care. This first US controlled assessment of the effectiveness of Housing First specifically targeting chronically homeless alcoholics showed that the program saved taxpayers more than $4 million over the first year of operation. During the first six months of a study of 95 residents in a Housing First program in downtown Seattle, even after considering the cost of administering the housing, the study reported an average cost-savings of 53 percent—nearly US$2,500 per month per person in health and social services, compared to the per month costs of a wait-list control group of 39 homeless people. Further, stable housing also results in reduced drinking among homeless alcoholics.

In Utah, there has been "a 72 percent decrease [in chronic homelessness] overall since enacting the plan in 2005" according to the Utah Division of Housing and Community Development. There has been some success with Utah's housing first plan, reducing chronic homelessness by 91 percent over the first ten years.

In September 2010, it was reported that the Housing First Initiative had significantly reduced the chronic homeless single person population in Boston, Massachusetts, although homeless families were still increasing in number. Some shelters were reducing the number of beds due to lowered numbers of homeless, and some emergency shelter facilities were closing, especially the emergency Boston Night Center. By 2015, Boston Mayor Marty Walsh had announced a 3-year plan to end chronic homelessness, focusing on coordinating efforts among public agencies and nonprofit organizations providing services to homeless men and women.

A research study from the University of North Carolina at Charlotte also reported that a housing project for the chronically homeless called Moore Place had saved the county $2.4 million.

When comparing the effects of Housing First on older and younger homeless adults, older homeless adults have shown significantly higher rates of improvement in areas like mental component summary scores, condition specific quality of life, mental health symptom severity, and percentage of days stably housed.

Critics of the Housing First approach have argued that some of the most severely mentally ill or drug addicted cannot be served effectively by the approach. In San Francisco, home to over 4,000 people experiencing homelessness and mental illness or drug addiction, a 2015 study found that 91% of those approached by the San Francisco homeless outreach team during sweeps refused the shelter offered to them, often due to underlying drug addiction or mental illness. Even when such individuals do accept housing, there are serious issues: 16% of all overdoses in San Francisco occur in government-provided single room occupancy housing (SROs) where there is insufficient infrastructure to prevent overdoses. Recent studies have suggested that institutionalization and compulsory drug rehab are ineffective in many cases, which has led to a broader adoption of Housing First solutions, but in practice support for these individuals in need often ends the moment they are housed. As a result, many struggle to move on to more sustainable self sufficient living; residents of San Francisco's SROs are more than twice as likely to overdose or return to homelessness than they are to move into permanent housing.

==== Endorsement ====
Housing First is currently endorsed by the United States Interagency Council on Homelessness (USICH) as a "best practice" for governments and service-agencies to use in their fight to end chronic homelessness in America.

==== Post-2007 U.S. policy and legislation ====
The United States Congress appropriated $25 million in the McKinney-Vento Homeless Assistance Grants for 2008 to show the effectiveness of Rapid Re-Housing programs in reducing family homelessness.

In February 2009, President Obama signed the American Recovery and Reinvestment Act of 2009, part of which addressed homelessness prevention, allocating $1.5 billion for a Homeless Prevention Fund. The funding for it was called the "Homelessness Prevention and Rapid Re-Housing Program" (HPRP), and was distributed using the formula for the Emergency Shelter Grants (ESG) program.

On May 20, 2009, President Obama signed the Homeless Emergency Assistance and Rapid Transition to Housing (HEARTH) Act into Public Law (Public Law 111-22 or "PL 111-22"), reauthorizing HUD's Homeless Assistance programs. It was part of the Helping Families Save Their Homes Act of 2009. The HEARTH act allows for the prevention of homelessness, rapid re-housing, consolidation of housing programs, and new homeless categories. In the eighteen months after the bill's signing, HUD must make regulations implementing this new McKinney program.

On June 11, 2014, the 100,000 Homes Campaign in the United States, launched in 2010 to "help communities around the country place 100,000 chronically homeless people into permanent supportive housing", announced that it reached its four-year goal of housing 100,000 chronically homeless people nearly two months before its July 29 deadline.

New York Times journalist David Bornstein summarized key elements of the 100,000 Homes Campaign that campaign leaders attribute to its success. This included learning individual homeless people's "name and need" by mobilizing volunteers to go very early in the morning to check on them, establishing a "vulnerability index" so they could prioritize certain homeless people and "bring housing advocates and agency representatives together to streamline the placement processes, and share ideas about how to cut through red tape."

=== Miscellaneous ===
As part of the H2020 research project "HOME_EU: Reversing Homelessness in Europe" by the European Commission, approximately 5600 surveys have been conducted between March and December 2017 in France, Ireland, Italy, the Netherlands, Portugal, Spain, Poland, and Sweden in order to understand people's knowledge, attitudes, and practices about homelessness and how much support the general public has in regards to Housing First as a solution for homelessness in Europe.

== Criticism of Housing First ==
=== Identification of outcomes ===
Housing First has been criticized on its failure to address broader service outcomes, namely substance abuse (in one case, it was argued that the only reason substance abuse outcomes were no worse was that the residents were not severely addicted). Researchers found through a systematic review that Housing First approaches did not consistently lead to improvements in health or mental health, but also did not lead to increased substance misuse. The long-term impacts on health are also unclear. These criticisms have been rebutted on the grounds that Housing First is a program to end homelessness and not to reduce substance abuse, though more recent research indicates it is more effective than traditional approaches in this regard as well. Other critics argue that the prevalence of substance use and mental health issues in homeless populations is tied to, or is a symptom of, the same structural causes of homelessness. Literature finds the association between substance use and homelessness to be bidirectional, as individuals may turn to substances to handle the conditions of homelessness. This exchange highlights the way in which the selection of outcomes sets both the terms of the debate and the parameters of "what works." Embedded in that mantra are a priori decisions about what constitutes working and for whom; in this case it was stable housing for the chronic homeless. In a rapid review and document analysis of Housing First scholarly literature in the U.S. and Canada, it has been shown that these literature are severely lacking in the implementation and explicit mention of harm reduction.

=== Ideological criticism of the evidence-based approach ===
In 2011, Professor Victoria Stanhope of New York University Silver School of Social Work and Professor Kerry Dunn of University of New England School of Social Work, writing in the International Journal of Law and Psychiatry, gave a critical overview of evidence-based policy, based on its reliance on positivist methods and technical approach to policy making, which used the Bush Administration's Housing First policy as a case study. According to Stanhope and Dunn, Housing First is "an example of research-driven policy making but also resulted in a progressive policy being promoted by a conservative administration". The paper argues that evidence-based policy fails to integrate evidence and values into policy deliberations, and concludes with alternative models of policy decision-making and their implications for research." According to Stanhope, Housing First "is an anathema to neoliberal ideology" because it asserts a fundamental right to housing and therefore "challenges deeply held beliefs that have shaped US welfare from its inception: That no one has a right to a government benefit unless they have proved themselves to be deserving or worthy (e.g., "TANF"), or have earned it (e.g., social insurance)." Stanhope argues that the dissonance between the fundamental right to housing that Housing First entails and neoliberal ideology has not been considered during policymaking, especially because of the focus on the empirical outcomes of Housing First.

== Alternatives to Housing First ==
=== Emergency response ===
Emergency response includes providing immediate needs to individuals and families experiencing homelessness. These basic services include shelter, food, hygiene facilities, health care, and crisis mental health services. These services are provided with low-barrier access and often are supported by rapid exit planning to help individuals quickly get into stable housing. Emergency response is completed through emergency shelters and street outreach. It is similar to Housing First in how the approach prioritizes getting individuals services and housing as quickly as possible, but Housing First has a much stronger focus on acquiring permanent housing. Emergency response focuses on any type of stable housing. For example, hotels have historically been used to house the homeless population temporarily while further accommodations are made.

=== Continuum of Care model ===
The Continuum of Care model is a housing approach based in a step-by-step progression and conditional housing. Specifically, it includes a coordinated local service system, where people experiencing homelessness transition through emergency shelters, to transitional housing, and eventually to permanent housing. This is similar to the staircase model, which the 'History' section covers in detail. The United States Department of Housing and Urban Development (HUD) introduced the Continuum of Care model in 1994 and funded many programs that implemented it. Like the staircase model, the Continuum of Care programs emphasize "readiness" before individuals move on to the next part of the system. This can sometimes be harmful, as it prolongs stays at emergency or transitional shelters.

=== Mixed model: merging Housing First with the Continuum of Care model ===
Some organizations have worked to incorporate the Housing First model within their Continuum of Care model. Especially in the US, this mixed approach was established by the Obama Administration's 2010 policy, Opening Doors: Federal Strategic Plan to Prevent and End Homelessness. This policy required that the Housing First model be incorporated into many of the HUD-funded homeless assistance programs. To shift away from the strict linear model and "housing readiness" of the Continuum of Care model, the US Interagency Council on Homelessness argued that permanent supportive housing, which is the final step of the Continuum of Care model, using a Housing First approach is the best solution. Many programs funded by the government, continued their linear model while incorporating a Housing First perspective. In practice, this means programs having less qualifying restrictions and a greater emphasis on immediate housing into all types of housing programs.

== See also ==
- Homelessness in the United States
- McKinney-Vento Homeless Assistance Act
- Right to property
- At Home, a Canadian program inspired by Housing First

== General and cited references ==
- Graves, Florence; Sayfan, Hadar, "First things first: 'Housing first,' a radical new approach to ending chronic homelessness, is gaining ground in Boston", The Boston Globe, Sunday, June 24, 2007.
- Greenwood, R; Schaefer-McDaniel, N; Winkel, G; Tsemberis, S (2005). "Decreasing psychiatric symptoms by increasing choice in services for adults with histories of homelessness". American Journal of Community Psychology. 36 (3/4): 223–38. doi:10.1007/s10464-005-8617-z. PMID 16389497. S2CID 26632429.
- Lyons, Julia, "A Home for the Homeless", February 26, 2008, The Salt Lake Tribune
- Pathways to Housing, Inc., New York (2005). "2005 APA Gold Award: Providing housing first and recovery services for homeless adults with severe mental illness". Psychiatric Services. 56 (10): 1303–5. doi:10.1176/appi.ps.56.10.1303. PMID 16215200.
- "U.S homeless czar to meet with Mayor, Nashville officials Friday", Nashville Business Journal, Thursday, April 17, 2008.
- Tsemberis, Sam; Eisenberg, Ronda R. (2000). "Pathways to Housing: Supported Housing for Street-Dwelling Homeless Individuals with Psychiatric Disabilities". Psychiatric Services. 51 (4): 487–93. doi:10.1176/appi.ps.51.4.487. PMID 10737824.
- Tsemberis S. (2004). "'Housing first' Approach" article in Encyclopedia of Homelessness, Thousand Oaks, CA: Sage, V1, pp. 277–80.
- Tsemberis, Sam; Gulcur, Leyla; Nakae, Maria (2004). "Housing First, Consumer Choice, and Harm Reduction for Homeless Individuals with a Dual Diagnosis". American Journal of Public Health. 94 (4): 651–56. doi:10.2105/AJPH.94.4.651. PMC 1448313. PMID 15054020.
- Tsemberis, Sam; Stefancic, Ana (2007). "Housing First for Long-Term Shelter Dwellers in a Suburban County: Traditional Housing and Treatment Services". The Journal of Primary Prevention. 28 (3): 265–279. doi:10.1007/s10935-007-0093-9. PMID 17592778.
