= Dr. Issac Elmer Williams House and Office =

Historic house in Ohio, United States

- Dr. Issac Elmer Williams House And Office
- U.S. National Register of Historic Places
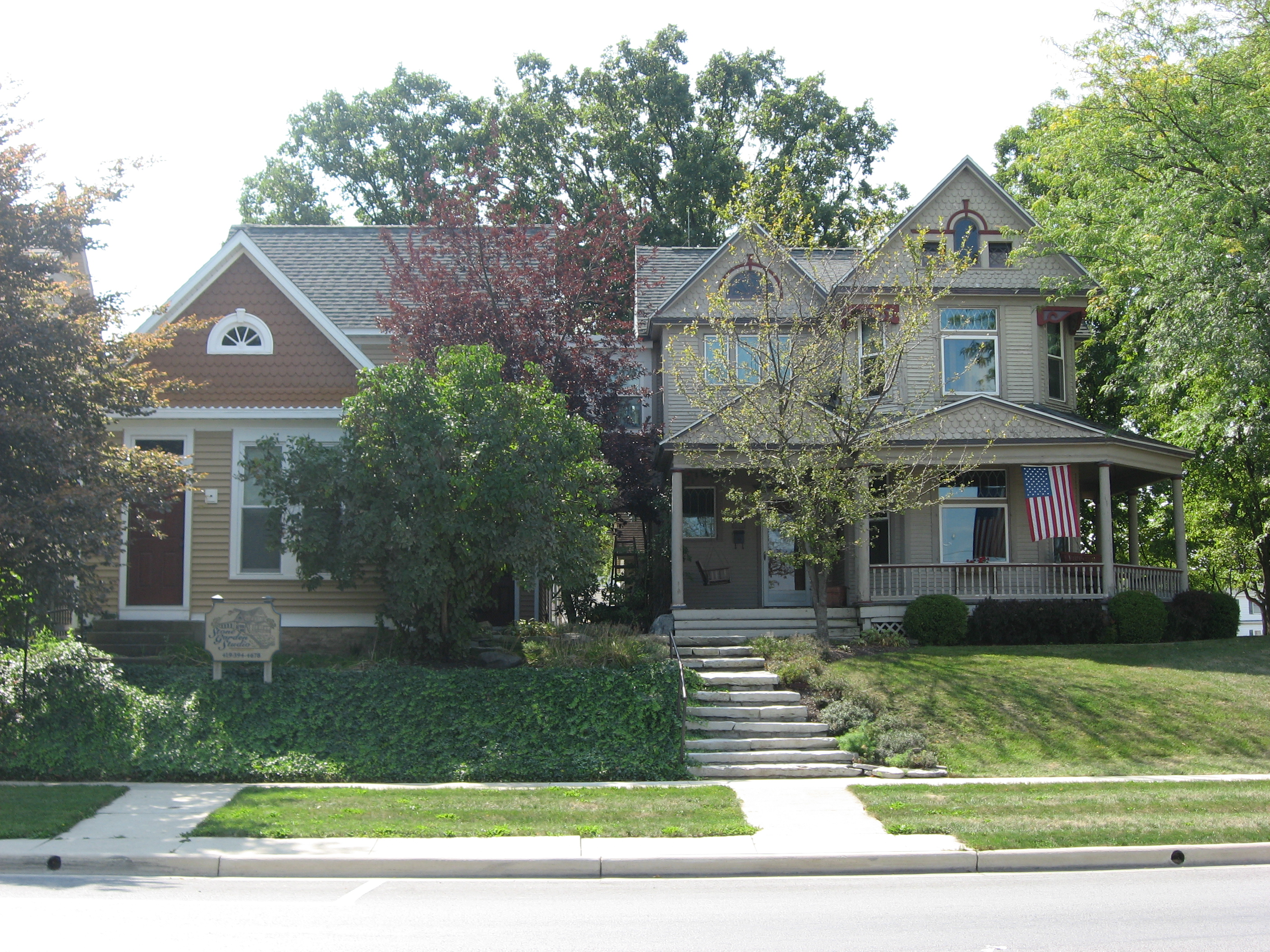
- Streetside view of the house (right) and the office (left)

- Location within Ohio Location within the United States
- Location: 407-411 N. Main St., St. Marys, Ohio
- Coordinates: 40°32′44″N 84°23′34″W
- Area: 0.5 acres (0.20 ha)
- Built: 1903
- Architectural style: Queen Anne
- NRHP reference No.: 79001785
- Added to NRHP: May 8, 1979

The Dr. Issac Elmer Williams House and Office are a pair of buildings in St. Marys, Ohio, United States. Built in 1903, both are fine examples of the Queen Anne style of architecture.

Immediately after graduating from the Kentucky School of Medicine at the University of Louisville in 1892, Williams began to practice medicine in St. Marys; he remained there until retirement in 1942. He built his house and office on the city's western side in 1903; their location adjacent to each other was a typical arrangement at the time for doctors in small cities such as St. Marys. These two buildings, both frame, feature the Queen Anne style common in the early twentieth century. Among the leading architectural features of the house are its large roof with multiple gables, of which the most prominent are those of the attic that feature imbricated shingles on their walls. Located to the south of the house, the office is a five-room single-story structure. Its design is similar to that of the house, including an attic gable with imbricated shingles.

In 1979, the house and office were listed together on the National Register of Historic Places. They qualified for inclusion on the Register both because of their contribution to local history and because of their architecture. As virtually no changes have been made either to the house or to the office — inside or out — they are excellent examples of early twentieth-century Queen Anne architecture, especially because of their location adjacent to each other. Moreover, these buildings are significant because of their place as a house-and-office combination of a typical early twentieth-century doctor.
