= Sam Tsemberis =

Greek Canadian psychologist

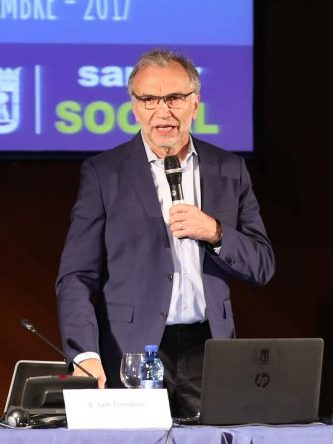
- Sam Tsemberis in 2024
- Born: March 11, 1949 (age 77); Skoúra, Greece
- Education: New York University PhD, Clinical and Community Psychology
- Occupations: Clinical and Community Psychologist | Clinical Community psychology
- Website: https://www.pathwayshousingfirst.org/

Sam J. Tsemberis (born March 11, 1949, in Skoúra, Lakonia, Greece) is a Greek Canadian psychologist and homelessness activist. He founded the Housing First program and the Pathways to Housing organization, and is CEO of the Pathways Housing First Institute. He is also an Associate Clinical Professor in Psychiatry and Bio-behavioral Sciences at the University of California, Los Angeles (UCLA).

Tsemberis founded the Pathways to Housing in 1992 to support the homeless population in New York in before expanding to other states. He co-authored the book Housing First: Ending Homelessness, Changing Systems and Transforming Lives with Deborah Padgett and Benjamin Henwood in 2016. Tsemberis was listed in the 2024 Time 100 list of influential people for the Housing First model.
