= King County Housing Authority =

United States public housing agency

The King County Housing Authority (KCHA) is a public housing agency serving King County, Washington, excluding the cities of Seattle and Renton. The agency oversees 132 properties, including more than 4,200 units of federally assisted subsidized housing and 6,000 units of workforce housing for qualified low- and moderate-income families and individuals. The agency also administers 10,000 Housing Choice (Section 8) vouchers. The agency's 2018 budget is $301 million.

== History ==
The King County Housing Authority was created in 1939 by the county government and completed its first project, a 50-unit development in Black Diamond, in 1942.

The agency's headquarters are in a former big-box store in Tukwila that was renovated with energy-efficient features.

== Projects ==
- Trailhead Apartments, Issaquah — planned to begin construction in 2024 or 2025 with 360 units

== See also ==
- Seattle Housing Authority
