= Barbara Poppe =

American homeless services administrator

Executive director of the United States Interagency Council on Homelessness
- In office 2009–2014
- President: Barack Obama
- Preceded by: Philip Mangano
- Succeeded by: Laura Zeilinger

Barbara Poppe (born 1958) was the executive director of the United States Interagency Council on Homelessness (USICH) from 2009 to 2014. Prior to her appointment at USICH, she spent over 20 years working on homelessness with housing-related organizations in Ohio. After her role at the USCIH, she founded a consulting business, Barbara Poppe & Associates LLC.

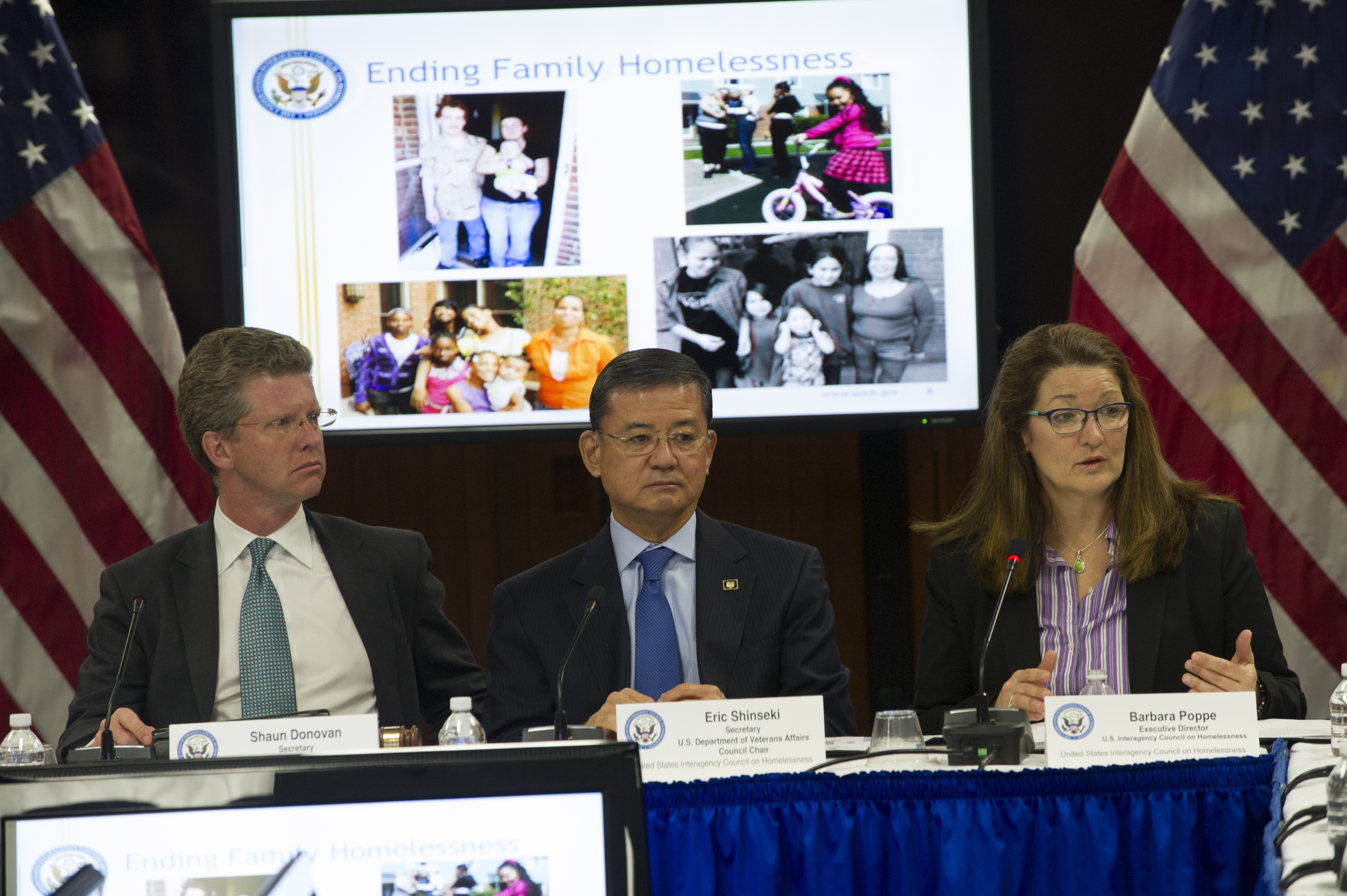

== Education ==
Poppe completed her undergraduate degree at William Woods University in Fulton, Missouri. She received a Bachelor of Science in chemistry. She continued her education at the University of Cincinnati, first as a medical student and then as a student of epidemiology in the College of Medicine's Department of Environmental Health. She received her Master of Science in epidemiology from the University of Cincinnati in 1987.

== Career ==
Poppe began her work in the homeless sector through volunteering in Cincinnati and co-found Bethany House Services in 1983. After completing her Master's in Epidemiology, Poppe worked as a Field Instructor for the University of Cincinnati in the Department of Environmental Health from July 1988 to June 1990. She was executive director of Friends of the Homeless, Inc., in Columbus, Ohio, from June 1990 to October 1995.

=== Community Shelter Board, Columbus, Ohio ===
Poppe served as executive director of the Community Shelter Board (CSB), a non-profit organization in Columbus, Ohio, from October 1995 to November 2009.

In 2006 she received the YWCA Women of Achievement award in Columbus, Ohio.

=== U.S. Interagency Council on Homelessness ===
Poppe was appointed to serve as executive director of the United States Interagency Council on Homelessness in October 2009. Poppe launched the first ever federal strategic plan to end homelessness "Opening Doors" in June 2020 as a roadmap for joint action by United States Interagency Council agencies to guide the development of programs and budget proposals towards a set of measurable targets to solve homelessness for veterans, adults, families, youth, and children. In 2016, the U.S. Interagency Council on Homelessness announced that the number of veterans experiencing homelessness in the United States has been cut nearly in half since the launch of "Opening Doors" in 2010.

She announced that she was leaving USICH February 4, 2014, and on February 18, 2014, it was announced that Laura Zeilinger would replace her.
