= Pathways to Housing =

US non-profit organization

Pathways to Housing is a not-for-profit organization founded in 1992 by Sam Tsemberis. It is the mission of Pathways to Housing to transform individual lives by ending homelessness and supporting recovery.

The organization is the originator of the Housing First model of addressing homelessness among people with severe psychiatric disabilities and substance use disorders. In Los Angeles, California, in 1988, the "Housing First" Program at Beyond Shelter was launched by Tanya Tull in response to a sharp increase in the number of homeless families with children. As an innovative model, Housing First has been nationally successful at addressing homelessness largely due to its focus on consumer choice. Consumers choose the neighborhoods they want to live in, how their apartments are furnished, and all other decisions regarding the use of their new homes. Consumers also determine the frequency, duration, and intensity of the support and treatment services they receive. Consumers feel secure knowing housing will be held for them during relapse, psychiatric crisis or short incarcerations. Consumers also know they have a voice and often attend Tenant Advisory Council meetings, which provides a forum for input into the program and solicits ideas for changes to meet new needs.

Using this consumer-driven approach, Pathways to Housing has achieved success in housing retention for its target population. In one federally-funded longitudinal random assignment study, 80% of the participants assigned to Pathways to Housing were in stable housing after 12 months compared to 24% for the three-step Continuum of Care programs. Housing serves approximately 700 individuals living in supported scattered-site apartments throughout New York City; Westchester County, New York; the District of Columbia, Burlington, Vermont and Philadelphia.

== History ==
In a widely cited article entitled Pathways to Housing, published in 2000, Tsemberis and Eisenberg reported on a study undertaken from 1993 to 1997 examining the effectiveness of a five-year (1993-1997) Pathways to Housing supported housing program on 242 clients with severe psychiatric disabilities and addictions in New York City. During that time Pathways to Housing NY provided "immediate access to independent scatter-site apartments for individuals with psychiatric disabilities who were homeless and living on the street." With an 88 percent retention rate, the "supported housing program achieved better housing tenure than did the comparison group."

By 2007 Pathways to Housing NY had an annual operating budget of $15M and was funded by grants from city, state and federal government, individual contributions, foundation grants and corporate support. By 2012 Pathways to Housing had successfully housed over 3,000 people with 85–90% retention since 2002.

In 2010, Pathways to Housing NY set up a mobile video exhibit at nine locations in New York City where there were over 36,000 homeless people in 2009. The exhibit featured an image of a homeless man sleeping on the sidewalk in downtown Manhattan projected on to a building. Words also projected asked passersby to send a text message to help get him off the streets. A text message sent triggered a new video loop in which the man gets up and walks in the door of his new apartment. The idea is to convey visually the organization’s approach to combatting homelessness, which emphasizes getting people who are homeless into housing first and then tackling issues like mental health and addiction.

Pathways to Housing NY filled for bankruptcy in 2015, after allegations that Pathways to Housing NY had not paid rent for some of their housing client in 2011 and 2012. In 2013, Tsemberis started Pathways to Housing National, an organization that's scope of services included providing training and technical assistance around housing first and providing support in developing operations at Pathways to Housing DC, Pathways to Housing PA, and Pathways Vermont. Pathways to Housing National filed for bankruptcy in 2016. Pathways Housing First Institute was started in 2019 and provides trainings around housing first.

Pathways to Housing DC, Pathways to Housing PA, Pathways Vermont, and Pathways Housing First Institute all currently function as separate entities.

== Canada ==
In Calgary, Alberta, the Alex Pathways to Housing Calgary which opened in 2007, has 150 individuals in scatter site homes in 2013. Client pay 30 percent of their income towards their rent: 85 percent of Pathways to Housing clients receive Assured Income for the Severely Handicapped (AISH) benefits and 15 percent receive Alberta Works. The Alex Pathways to Housing uses a Housing First model, but it also uses Assertive Community Treatment (ACT), an integrated approach to healthcare where clients access a team of "nurses, mental health specialists, justice specialists and substance abuse specialists." Director Sue Fortune is committed to the 10 Year Plan To End Homelessless in the Calgary Region. Fortune reported that the Housing First approach resulted in a 66 percent decline in days hospitalized (from one year prior to intake compared to one year in the program), a 38 percent decline in times in emergency room, a 41 percent decline in EMS events, a 79 percent decline in days in jail and a 30 percent decline in police interactions.

Pathways to Housing Canada describes the Housing First as a "client-driven strategy that provides immediate access to an apartment without requiring initial participation in psychiatric treatment or treatment for sobriety."

In Economic Action Plan 2013, the Federal Government of Canada proposed $119 million annually from March 2014 until March 2019—with $600 million in new funding—to renew its Homelessness Partnering Strategy (HPS). In dealing with homelessness in Canada, the focus is on the Housing First model. Thus, private or public organizations across Canada are eligible to receive HPS subsidies to implement Housing First programs.

== See also ==
- Homelessness in the United States
- Housing First
- Substance abuse
