= United States Interagency Council on Homelessness =

U.S. executive branch agency

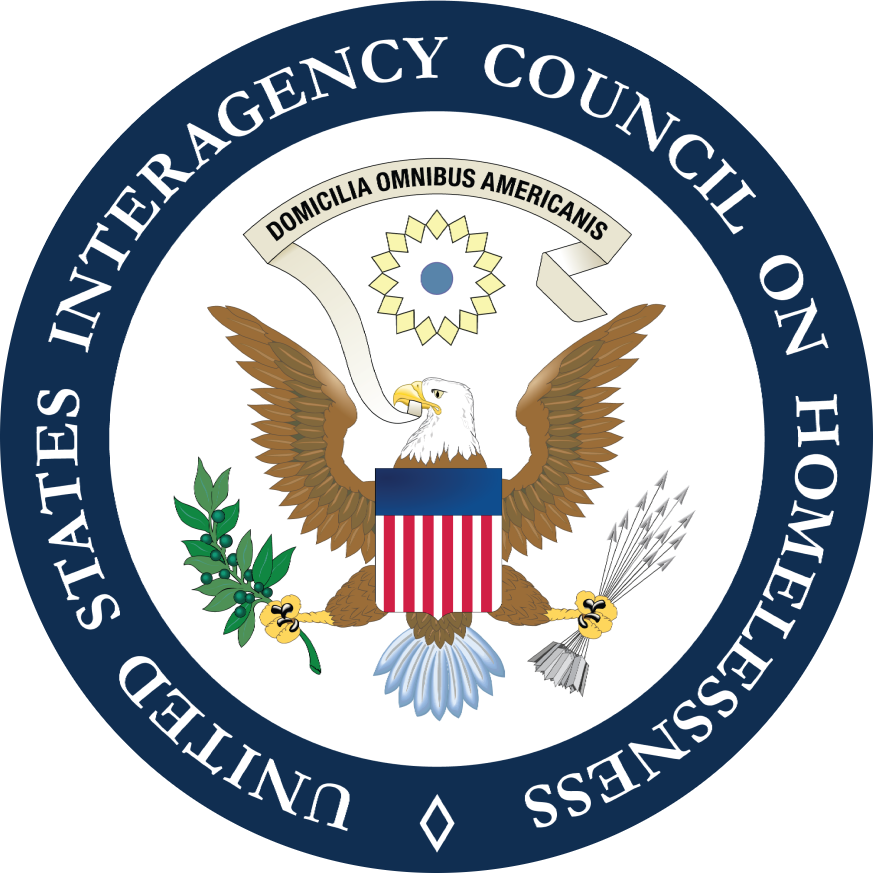

Agency overview
- Formed: July 22, 1987
- Headquarters: 1275 First Street NE Suite 227 Washington, D.C. 20552
- Employees: 18 (2021)
- Annual budget: $3.8 million (2021)
- Agency executive: Anthony Love, interim executive director
- Website: www.USICH.gov

The United States Interagency Council on Homelessness (USICH) is an independent federal agency within the U.S. executive branch that leads the implementation of the federal strategic plan to prevent and end homelessness. USICH is advised by a Council, which includes the heads of its 20 federal member agencies.

In March 2025, President Trump issued an executive order that directed eliminating the Council "to the maximum extent consistent with applicable law", along with several other agencies.

== Description ==
USICH partners with these 19 federal agencies, state and local governments, advocates, service providers, and people experiencing homelessness to achieve the goals outlined in the first federal strategic plan to prevent and end homelessness, Opening Doors.

USICH is made up of a small team headquartered in Washington, D.C.. Policy staff work closely with each of the 20 Federal Agencies that make up the Council to make progress on the goals and strategies of Opening Doors. USICH works directly with states and communities through five Regional Coordinators who connect with state and local governments in the creation of strategic plans and to promote the strategies of Opening Doors in local communities.

USICH works with its partners to

- Establish and maintain effective, coordinated, and supportive relationships with every federal agency;
- Organize and support states and communities to effectively implement local plans to end homelessness;
- Develop an effective portal to federal programs and initiatives;
- Establish and maintain productive communications with Congress;
- Establish partnerships with public and private sector stakeholders;
- Monitor, evaluate, and recommend improvements in serving those experiencing homelessness and disseminate best practices;
- Provide professional and technical assistance to states, local governments, and other public and private nonprofit organizations.

In 2010, the agency released the first federal strategic plan to end homelessness in the United States which includes four goals

1. To finish the job of ending chronic homelessness by 2015.
2. To prevent and end homelessness among Veterans by 2015.
3. To prevent and end homelessness for families, youth, and children by 2020.
4. To set a path to ending all types of homelessness.

== History ==
The Interagency Council on the Homeless was authorized by Title II of the landmark Stewart B. McKinney Homeless Assistance Act enacted on July 22, 1987 (PL 100-77). The McKinney Act established the Interagency Council on the Homeless as an "independent establishment" within the executive branch to review the effectiveness of federal activities and programs to assist people experiencing homelessness, promote better coordination among agency programs, and inform state and local governments and public and private sector organizations about the availability of federal homeless assistance. In 2002, Council members voted to approve changing the name of the agency to the United States Interagency Council on Homelessness (USICH), a change that was enacted into law in 2004 (PL 108-199).

USICH was reauthorized in 2009 with enactment of the Homeless Emergency Assistance and Rapid Transition to Housing (HEARTH) Act. (PL111-22).

The Council originally included the heads (or their representatives) of 16 Federal agencies. Five additional agencies were subsequently added by Council vote or statutory amendments, while two agencies are now inactive. The current members of the Council include the heads of the following 19 Departments and agencies:

- U.S. Department of Agriculture
- U.S. Department of Commerce
- U.S. Department of Defense
- U.S. Department of Education
- U.S. Department of Energy
- U.S. Department of Health and Human Services
- U.S. Department of Homeland Security
- Housing and Urban Development (HUD)
- U.S. Department of Interior
- U.S. Department of Justice (DOJ)
- U.S. Department of Labor (DOL)
- U.S. Department of Transportation (DOT)
- U.S. Department of Veterans Affairs (VA)
- Corporation for National and Community Service (Americorps)
- General Services Administration (GSA)
- Office of Management and Budget
- Social Security Administration
- United States Postal Service (USPS)
- White House Office of Faith-based and Community Initiatives

The immediate past chair was Department of Health and Human Services Secretary Sylvia Mathews Burwell, and the vice chair was Secretary of Education John King.

== Directors ==
- Philip Mangano, 2002 – 2009
- Barbara Poppe, 2009 – March 2014
- Laura Green Zeilinger, March 2014 – January 2015
- Matthew Doherty, April 2015 – November 2019
- Robert G. Marbut, December 2019 – 2021
- Anthony Love, 2021 - 2022
- Jeff Olivet, 2022 - present
