= List of people from Toronto =

List of notable people originating from Toronto

This is a list of notable people who are from Toronto, Ontario, or have spent a large part or formative part of their career in that city.

== A ==
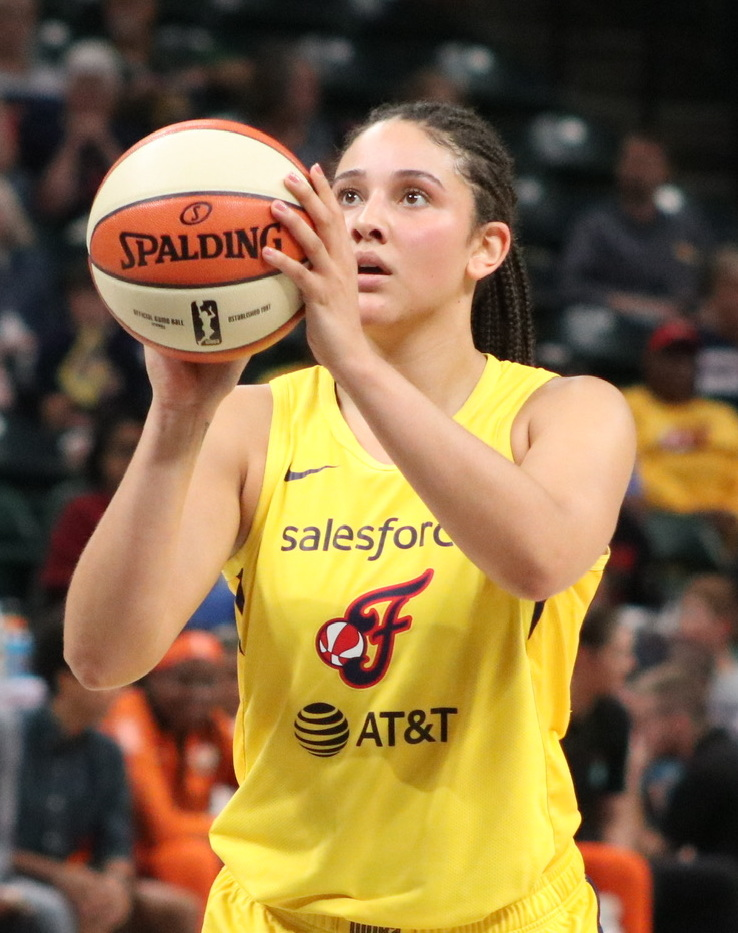
Natalie Achonwa

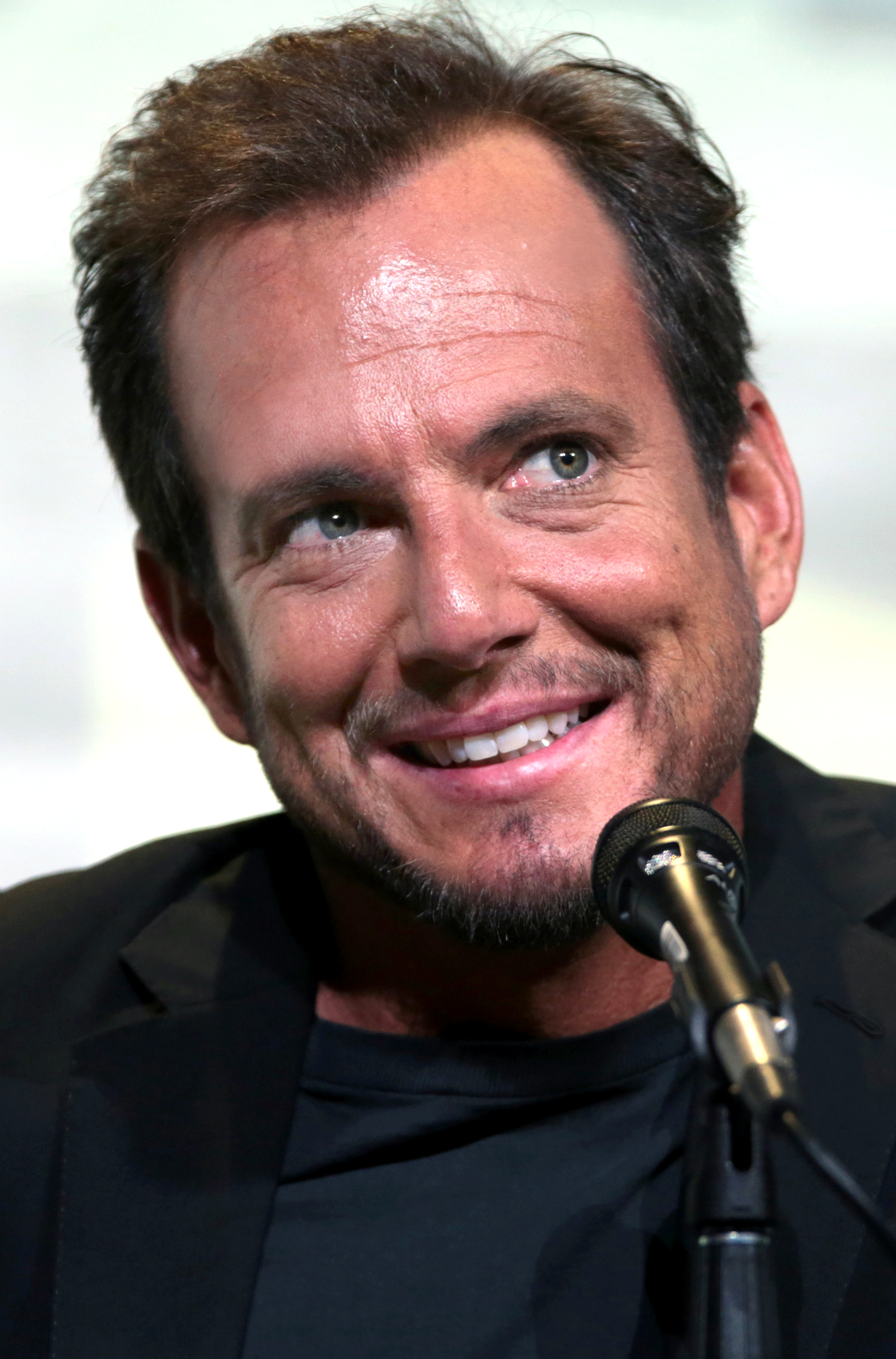
Will Arnett

- Abdominal (Andy Bernstein)– hip hop musician
- Natalie Achonwa – WNBA player
- Patrick J. Adams – actor (Suits)
- Oluniké Adeliyi – actress (Flashpoint)
- Ali Ahmed – soccer player
- Jeremie Albino – musician
- Jim Aldred – ice hockey player and coach
- Chris Alexander – diplomat
- Nickeil Alexander-Walker – NBA player
- Robbie Amell – actor
- Stephen Amell – actor (Arrow)
- Faith Amour, jazz singer
- Enza Anderson – writer, transgender rights activist
- Shamier Anderson – actor
- Gordon Stewart Anderson – author
- John Andrews – architect
- Mark Andrews – swimmer
- Lou Angotti – former NHL player
- Kent Angus – businessman
- Steve Anthony – television host
- Danny Antonucci – animator and creator of Ed, Edd n Eddy
- Andreas Apostolopoulos – businessman
- Alfred Apps – businessman, lawyer and political activist
- Syl (Charles) Apps – former NHL player
- Will Arnett – actor
- Amy Ashmore Clark – vaudeville performer, songwriter, composer
- Margaret Atwood – Booker Prize-winning novelist, poet, literary critic and essayist
- Ayria (Jennifer Parkin)– musician
- Yank Azman – actor

== B ==
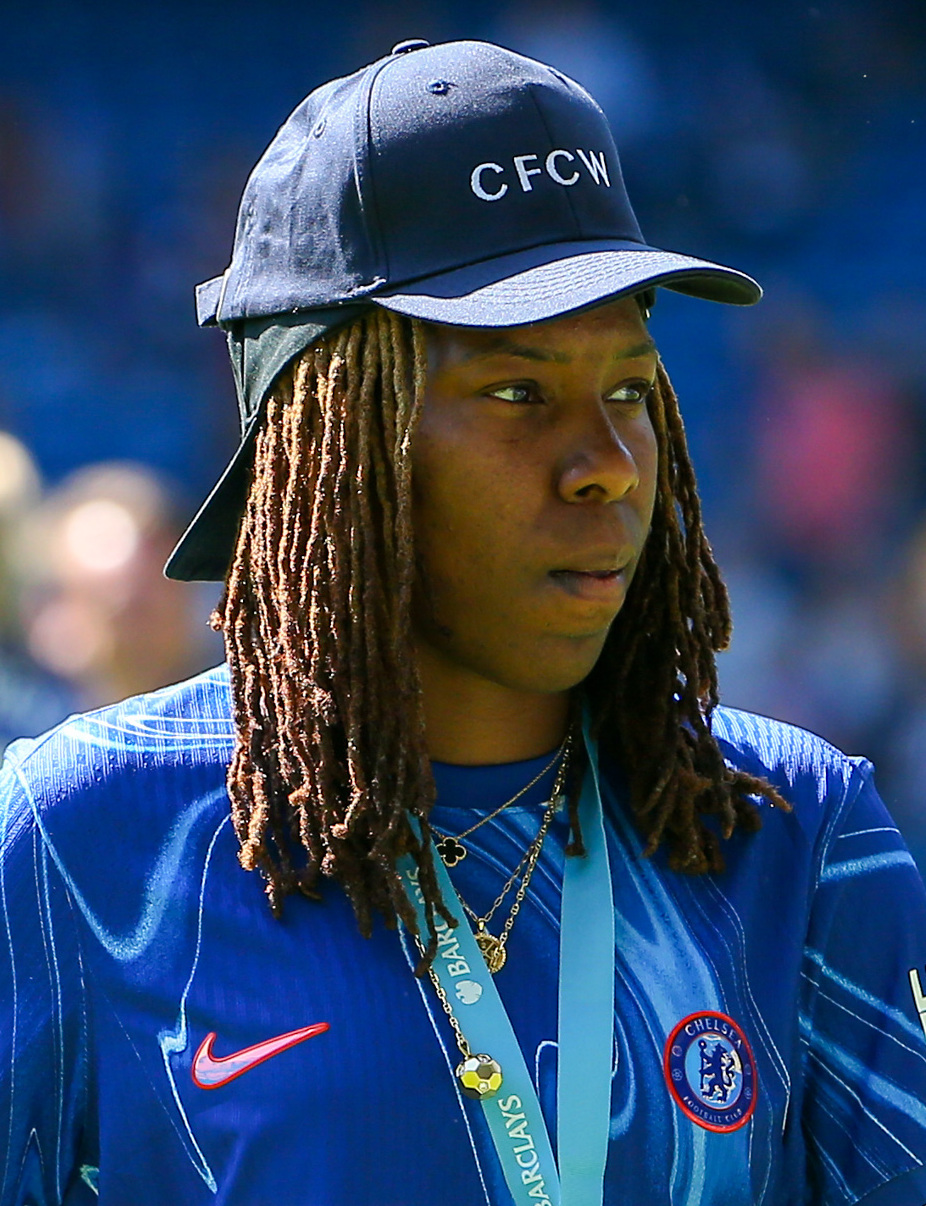
- Kadeisha Buchanan
  Andrew Bachelor – actor, comedian, and internet personality
- Aaron Badgley – music journalist and radio host
- Jay Bahadur – journalist and author, known for his reporting on piracy in Somalia
- Dalano Banton – NBA player, currently plays for the Boston Celtics
- RJ Barrett – NBA player, currently plays for the Toronto Raptors
- Thomas J. Bata – businessman
- Robert McLELLAN Bateman – painter
- Eric Bauza – voice actor (Bunnicula, Looney Tunes Cartoons, Tiny Toons Looniversity)
- Isabel Bayrakdarian – opera singer
- Jake Beale – voice actor
- Samantha Bee – actress and comedian
- Jeanne Beker – fashion television personality and reporter
- John Wilson Bengough – cartoonist
- Alfred David Benjamin – Australian-born businessman and philanthropist
- Anthony Bennett – NBA player
- Christine Bentley – CTV news anchor
- Nikki Benz – pornographic film actress
- Pierre Berton – author, historian, journalist and TV personality
- Charles Herbert Best – medical scientist, co-discoverer of insulin
- Sim Bhullar – professional basketball player
- Alfred J. Billes – co-founder of Canadian Tire
- J. William Billes – co-founder of Canadian Tire
- Josh Binstock – Olympic volleyball player
- Conrad Black – media mogul
- Jully Black – R&B singer
- Rachel Blanchard – actress
- Lloyd Wolf Bochner – actor (Dynasty)
- Andy Borodow – Olympic wrestler
- Devon Bostick – actor, known for playing Rodrick in the Diary of a Wimpy Kid series
- Hédi Bouraoui – poet, novelist and academic
- John McEntee Bowman – founding president of Bowman-Biltmore Hotels Corp.
- Liona Boyd – classical guitarist, composer, songwriter and singer
- Shary Boyle – artist
- Diana Braithwaite – electric blues singer, songwriter and screenwriter
- Cindy Breakspeare – Miss World 1976 and mother of Grammy-winning reggae musician Damian Marley
- Oshae Brissett (born 1998) – Israeli Basketball Premier League, former NBA, basketball player
- Christopher Britton – actor, stage actor, and voice actor
- Daniel Brooks – theatre director, actor and playwright
- Chester Brown – alternative cartoonist and Libertarian Party of Canada candidate
- Clifton Brown – kickboxer
- Billy Bryans – musician
- Kadeisha Buchanan –
- Rob Burgess – tech CEO
- Marty Burke – former NHL player
- Theresa Burke – journalist
- Matthew Burnett – record producer
- Martha Burns – actress
- Jackie Burroughs – actress
- Jim Butterfield – computer programmer
- Mikey Bustos – Fillipino-Canadian YouTuber

== C ==
- Daniel Caesar – singer
- Barry Callaghan – historian
- Morley Callaghan – journalist, writer
- Jaime Callica – actor and dancer
- June Callwood – social activist, journalist
- Bill Cameron – journalist
- Fred Cameron – soccer player
- Christian Campbell – actor
- Neve Campbell – actress (Party of Five, Scream series)
- Nicholas Campbell – actor (Da Vinci's Inquest)
- Sterling Campbell – former MPP
- John Candy – comic actor
- Marsha Canham - novelist
- Jim Carrey – actor and comedian
- Shelley Carroll – municipal politician
- Anson Carter – professional hockey player
- Luciana Carro – actress
- Gino Cavallini – former NHL player
- Lucas Cavallini – soccer player
- Paul Cavallini – former NHL player
- Michael Cera – actor, singer, musician
- Katie Chan – professional ice hockey player
- Patrick Chan – figure skater
- Christopher Chapman – film director, writer, and cinematographer
- Ann Y. K. Choi – author
- Hayden Christensen – actor
- Choclair – hip hop musician
- Ping Chong – contemporary theatre director
- Mark Chung – soccer player who represented the United States national team
- Olivia Chow – 66th Mayor of Toronto, Former New Democratic Party Member of Parliament, former Toronto city councillor
- Rebecca M. Church (d. 1945), president, Imperial Order Daughters of the Empire
- George Chuvalo – boxer
- Jerry Ciccoritti – film, TV, and theatre director
- Casey Cizikas – NHL player
- William Robinson Clark – theologian, Fellow and President of the Royal Society of Canada
- Austin Clarke – writer
- Adrienne Clarkson – journalist, broadcaster and former Governor General of Canada
- David Clarkson – NHL player
- Paul Clatney – Canadian football player
- Sebastian Cluer – director, producer, writer
- Hampden Cockburn – recipient of the Victoria Cross
- Andrew Cogliano – NHL player for the Dallas Stars
- Matt Cohen – writer
- Dusty Cohl – filmmaker, co-founder of the Toronto International Film Festival and Canada's Walk of Fame
- Carlo Colaiacovo – NHL player
- Enrico Colantoni – actor (Veronica Mars, Flashpoint)
- John Colicos – actor
- James Collip – scientist
- John Colapinto – journalist, author and novelist
- Alex Colville – painter
- Brian Conacher – former NHL player
- Charlie Conacher – former NHL player
- Pete Conacher – former NHL player
- Roy Conacher – former NHL player
- Kurtis Conner – comedian and YouTuber
- Jesse Cook – Juno Award winning guitarist
- Stephen Cook – computer scientist
- Jack Kent Cooke – industrialist
- Adam "Edge" Copeland – Independent, WWE, and AEW professional wrestler
- Barry Cort – former MLB player
- Douglas Coupland – writer, artist
- Alyson Court – actor
- Christina Cox – actress, stuntwoman
- Deborah Cox – singer
- Harold Scott MacDonald Coxeter – world's best known geometer
- Laura Creavalle – Guyanese-born Canadian/American professional bodybuilder
- Rob Crifo – Canadian football player
- J. Howard Crocker – educator and sports executive with the YMCA and Amateur Athletic Union of Canada
- Jonathan Crombie – actor
- Neil Crone – actor, comedian
- David Cronenberg – film director
- Jim Cuddy – musician, lead singer of Blue Rodeo
- Ayesha Curry – entrepreneur
- Henry Czerny – actor

== D ==
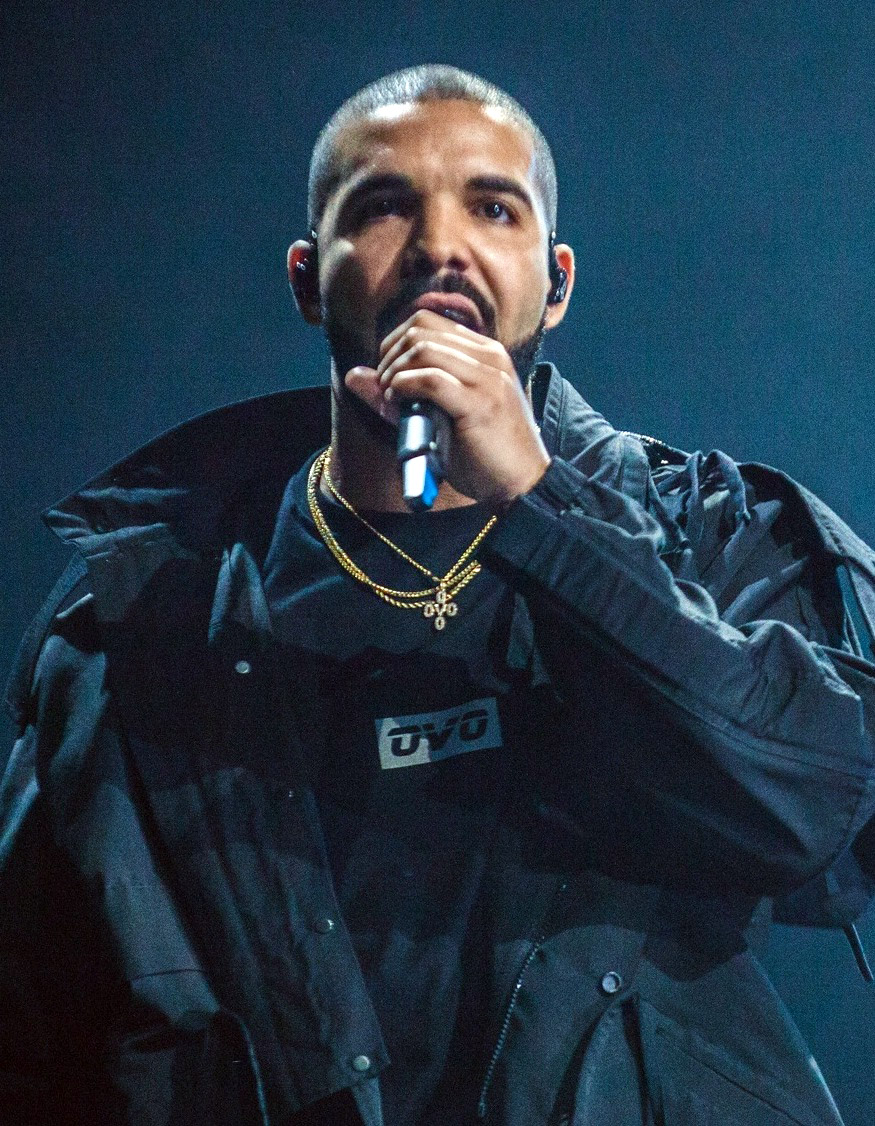
Drake

- Chantal Da Silva – journalist residing in the U.K.
- Cynthia Dale – actress
- Jennifer Dale – actress
- Cathy Daley – visual artist, educator
- Claire Dalton – forward for the Toronto Sceptres of the Professional Women's Hockey League, scored the first goal in franchise history for the Montreal Victoire.
- Leslie Dan – businessman
- Mychael Danna – Academy Award-winning film composer (Life of Pi)
- Robertson Davies – writer
- Fred Davis – radio/TV broadcaster (Front Page Challenge)
- Janet Davis – municipal politician
- William B. Davis – actor (The X Files)
- Clifton Dawson – NFL player
- deadmau5 – electronic music producer and DJ
- Nicole de Boer – actress
- Michael DeForge – comics artist and illustrator
- Dana Dentata – musician and model
- Andre De Grasse – sprinter
- Laysla De Oliveira – actress
- Jack Devine – President of the Canadian Amateur Hockey Association and radio personality
- Natalie Di Luccio - operatic singer
- Sergio Di Zio – actor (Flashpoint)
- Chris Diamantopoulos – actor and comedian
- Jack Diamond – architect
- Diamond Rings (John O'Regan)– music artist
- Wayne Dillon – former NHL player
- Rosie DiManno - journalist
- Cheri DiNovo – politician
- DL Incognito – hip hop musician
- Nina Dobrev – actress
- Fefe Dobson – singer
- Cory Doctorow – blogger, journalist and science fiction author
- Fateh Doe – rapper, singer, and lyricist
- Andy Donato – editorial cartoonist for the Toronto Sun
- Peter Donato – marathon runner
- Max Douglas a.k.a. Salgood Sam – comic artist, author, and blogger
- Naheed Dosani – doctor
- Riele Downs – actress
- John Drainie – actor
- Drake – rapper
- Kris Draper – NHL
- Dream Warriors – hip hop group
- Jamie Drysdale – ice hockey player
- Rob Ducey – MLB player
- Rick Dudley – former NHL player
- Filip Dujic – soccer referee
- Alexander Roberts Dunn – recipient of the Victoria Cross
- Kyle Bobby Dunn – composer, arranger, performer
- George Dunning – animator, director
- Steve Durbano – former NHL player
- Arthur Jeffrey Dempster – physicist
- Julian Dzeko – DJ/producer and member of Dzeko & Torres with Luis Torres

== E ==
- Jayne Eastwood – actress
- Timothy Eaton – retail proprietor
- Tim Ecclestone – former NHL player
- Tom Edur – former NHL player
- Gary Edwards – former NHL player
- Atom Egoyan – film director
- Oren Eizenman – Israeli-Canadian ice hockey player
- Kilian Elkinson (born 1990) – Bermudian footballer
- David James Elliott – actor (JAG)
- Emma-Lee – singer-songwriter and photographer
- Rik Emmett – guitarist, vocalist, original member of hard rock band Triumph.
- Bob Essensa – former NHL player
- George Evans – jazz singer, producer, recording artist
- Gil Evans – jazz musician
- Jake Evans – ice hockey player for the Montreal Canadiens
- Jordan Evans – record producer
- Dylan Everett – actor
- J. S. Ewart – advocate for Canadian independence

== F ==
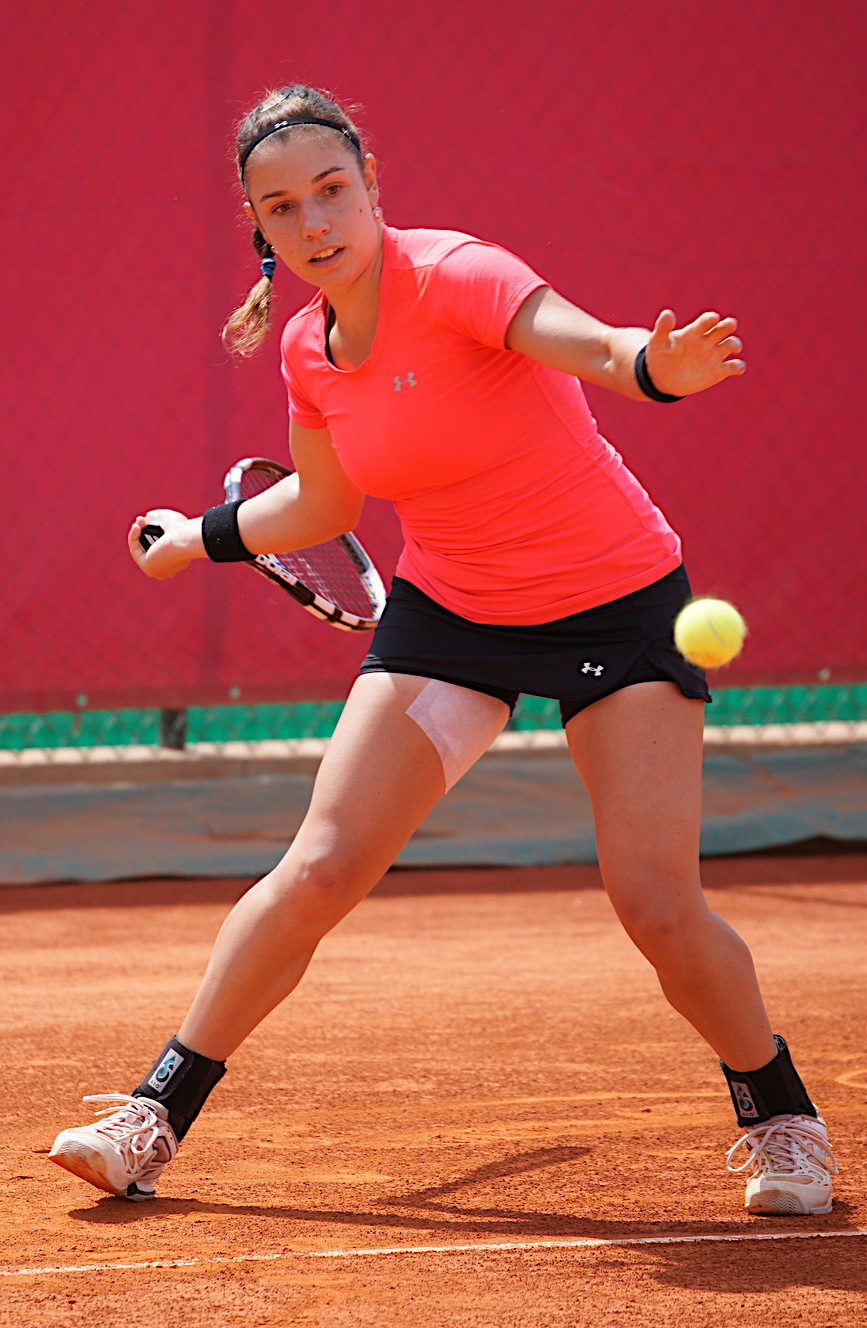
Sharon Fichman

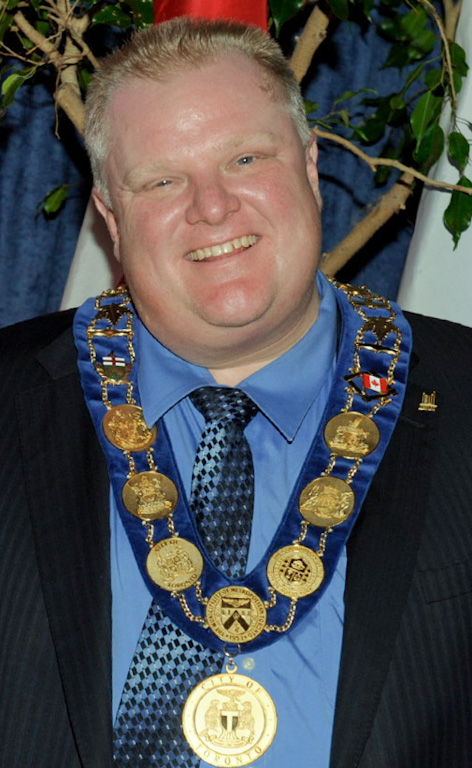
Rob Ford

- Percy Faith – composer
- George Faludy – poet
- Hilary Farr – home designer, Love It or List It
- Holly Farrell – self-taught outsider artist; Barbie & Ken series
- Leslie Feist – singer-songwriter
- Perdita Felicien – hurdler
- Mario Ferraro – NHL player
- Louis Ferreira – actor
- Sharon Fichman – Canadian/Israeli tennis player
- Joy Fielding, writer
- Timothy Findley – writer
- Melanie Fiona – R&B musician
- John Fitzpatrick – track and fielder, football player, engineer and inventor
- Joe Flaherty – comic actor
- Lola Flanery - actress
- Patrick Flatley – former NHL player
- Ian Flynn – comic book writer
- Dave Foley – comedian
- Megan Follows – actress (Anne of Green Gables)
- Evan Fong – YouTube Personality also called VanossGaming
- Adam Foote – former NHL player
- Doug Ford Sr. – businessman and politician
- Doug Ford Jr. – politician and businessman
- Michael Ford – politician
- Rob Ford – 64th Mayor of Toronto
- Dwight Foster – former NHL player
- Liam Foudy – NHL player
- Sean Foudy – football player
- Rick Fox – NBA basketball player and actor
- Lou Franceschetti – former NHL player
- Mark Friedman – NHL player
- Barbara Frum – journalist, news anchor
- David Frum – political commentator
- Ajay Fry – television host/personality
- Northrop Frye – literary critic, academic
- David Furnish – filmmaker and producer, husband of Elton John

== G ==
- Sarah Gadon – actress
- Bill Gardner – ice hockey player
- Ed Gass-Donnelly – film director, screenwriter and producer
- Daniel Gaudet – Olympic gymnast
- Frank Gehry – architect
- Jack Gelineau – NHL player
- General Idea – art collective
- Eric Genuis – pianist and composer
- Jian Ghomeshi – radio and TV broadcaster, writer, musician
- Tamara Giaquinto – PWHL player
- Graeme Gibson – writer
- Sky Gilbert – writer, actor, drag performer
- Shai Gilgeous-Alexander – NBA player
- Piper Gilles – olympian ice dancer
- Paul Gillis – former NHL player
- George Clay Ginty – Union Army Brigadier General
- Mark Giordano – NHL player for the Toronto Maple Leafs
- Ken Girard – NHL player
- Malcolm Gladwell – writer (Tipping Point, Blink!)
- Natalie Glebova – Miss Universe Canada 2005, Miss Universe 2005
- Brian Glennie – NHL player
- Fred Glover – NHL player and coach
- Warren Godfrey – NHL player
- Ritika Goel – doctor, writer, academic, activist
- Thelma Golden – All-American Girls Professional Baseball League player
- Emma Goldman – political activist
- Kat Goldman – singer-songwriter
- Glenn Goldup – former NHL player
- Sasha Gollish – competitive runner
- Larry Goodenough – former NHL player
- Barclay Goodrow – NHL ice hockey player
- Allan Gotlieb – ex-Canadian diplomat
- Sondra Gotlieb – writer
- Glenn Gould – pianist
- Katherine Govier – writer
- Lawrence Gowan – musician, lead vocalist of the band Styx (1999–present)
- Barbara Gowdy – writer, fiction
- Dakota Goyo – actor
- Arthur Edward Grasett – commander of VIII Corps during the Second World War
- Saya Gray – musician
- Edward Greenspan – lawyer and politician
- Barbara Greenwood – educator and children's author
- Kathryn Greenwood – actress
- John Greyson – filmmaker (Proteus)
- Lynne Griffin – actress
- Shenae Grimes – actress
- Paul Gross – actor, producer, director
- Allan Grossman – politician
- Group of Seven – art collective
- Peter Gzowski – radio broadcaster (CBC Radio's Morningside) and writer

== H ==
- Ian Hacking – philosopher
- Corey Haim – actor
- George Hainsworth – former NHL player
- Michael Hainsworth – business reporter
- Barbara Hamilton – actress
- Dougie Hamilton – NHL player, currently with the New Jersey Devils
- Moshe Hammer – violinist
- Rick Hampton (born 1956) – former NHL player
- Ned Hanlan – rower
- Yuzuru Hanyu – figure skater
- Stephen Harper (born 1959) – 22nd Prime Minister of Canada
- Billy Harris (1935–2001) – former NHL player
- Billy Harris (born 1952) – former NHL player
- Lawren Harris – Group of Seven artist
- Mike Harris (born 1945) – premier of Ontario from 1995-2002
- Richard Harrison – poet
- Don Harron – comedian, actor, director, radio/TV host, author and composer
- Leon Hatziioannou – Canadian football player
- Asante Haughton – mental health worker and activist
- Dale Hawerchuk – former NHL player
- Brent Hawkes – clergyman, gay rights activist
- Ronnie Hawkins – musician
- Jeff Healey – musician
- Steven Heighton – novelist, poet
- Alan Milliken Heisey Sr. – politician, author, publisher
- Karl Brooks Heisey – mining engineer and executive
- Lawrence Heisey – publisher
- Charles J. Helm, Kentucky politician, U.S. Consul General to Cuba, diplomat and expatriate of the Confederate States
- Katherine Henderson – president and CEO of Curling Canada and Hockey Canada
- Murray Henderson – former NHL player
- Adam Henrich (born 1984) – ice hockey player
- Michael Henrich (born 1980) – ice hockey player
- Sheila Heti – author
- Foster Hewitt – sports broadcaster (Hockey Night in Canada)
- W. A. Hewitt – sports executive and journalist, Hockey Hall of Fame inductee
- Dan Hill – singer-songwriter
- George Hislop – gay activist
- Lionel Hitchman – former NHL player
- Abby Hoffman – track and field
- Joshua Ho-Sang (born 1996) – ice hockey player
- Nadia L. Hohn – children's book writer
- Clive Holden – poet, film director and visual artist
- Laurie Holden – actress (The Walking Dead)
- Dan Hill – singer
- Jason Hook – Guitarist
- Mike Hoolboom – filmmaker
- Kenny Hotz – actor (Kenny vs Spenny)
- Lauren Howe – Miss Universe Canada 2017
- Andrew Huang – musician / YouTuber
- Jack Hughes (born 2001) – NHL player
- Stuart Hughes – actor
- Walter Huston – Academy Award-winning actor (The Treasure of the Sierra Madre)
- William Hutt – actor (Stratford Festival)
- Zach Hyman – NHL ice hockey player

== I ==
- Marci Ien – journalist and politician
- Michael Ignatieff – federal Liberal leader, academic, journalist
- George "Punch" Imlach – former NHL coach and general manager
- Malcolm Ingram – independent film director and podcaster
- Gary Inness – former NHL player
- Harold Innis – economist and university professor
- Michael Ironside – actor
- Kenneth E. Iverson – computer scientist

== J ==
- A.Y. Jackson – Group of Seven artist
- Harvey "Busher" Jackson – former NHL player
- Jane Jacobs – economist, urban theorist and activist
- Lisa Jakub – former child actress
- Stephan James – actor
- Gary Jarrett – former NHL player
- Maureen Jennings – novelist
- Peter Jennings – ABC News anchor
- Connor Jessup – actor, short film director
- Norman Jewison – film director (Moonstruck)
- Joël – singer-songwriter, dancer
- Harold E. Johns – medical physicist
- Amy Jo Johnson – actress
- Ben Johnson – sprinter, stripped of 100m gold medal at 1988 Summer Olympics for doping
- Matt Johnson – film director, screenwriter, producer, actor
- Molly Johnson – singer-songwriter
- Jamie Johnston – actor
- Stewart Johnston – 15th Commissioner of the CFL
- George Jonas – writer, journalist
- Cory Joseph – NBA player for the Orlando Magic
- Demetrius Joyette – actor
- Just John x Dom Dias – musical duo

== K ==
- William Kahan – mathematician and computer scientist
- Greg Kading - LAPD detective from 1986-2010
- Irving Kaplansky – mathematician
- Moez Kassam – hedge fund manager, founder of Anson Group
- Hadley Kay – actor
- Guy Gavriel Kay – writer
- Mark-Anthony Kaye – soccer player
- Sherry Kean – singer
- Trenna Keating – actress
- Brian Kernighan – computer scientist
- Ben Kerr – busker
- John Kerr – soccer player and coach
- Mart Kenney – jazz musician and bandleader
- Michael Kerzner – Solicitor General of Ontario
- The Kids in the Hall – television comedy troupe
- Gail Kim – female professional wrestler
- William Lyon Mackenzie King – 10th Prime Minister of Canada
- Gord Kirke – lawyer and sports executive
- Mia Kirshner – actor
- Naomi Klein – journalist, author (No Logo, The Shock Doctrine) and social activist
- K'naan – hip hop musician
- Mike Knuble – former NHL player
- Chris Kontos – former NHL player
- Terry Koumoudouros – strip club owner-operator
- K-os – hip hop musician
- Ted Kotcheff – director
- George Kottaras – MLB player
- H. David Kotz – attorney
- Anton Kuerti – pianist
- Aggie Kukulowicz – former NHL player, Air Canada travel agent
- Maya Kulenovic – painter
- Floyd Kuptana – Inuk artist
- Faisal Kutty – lawyer, writer, Muslim activist
- Bruce Kuwabara – architect
- Nick Kypreos – former NHL player
- Young K – k pop singer

== L ==
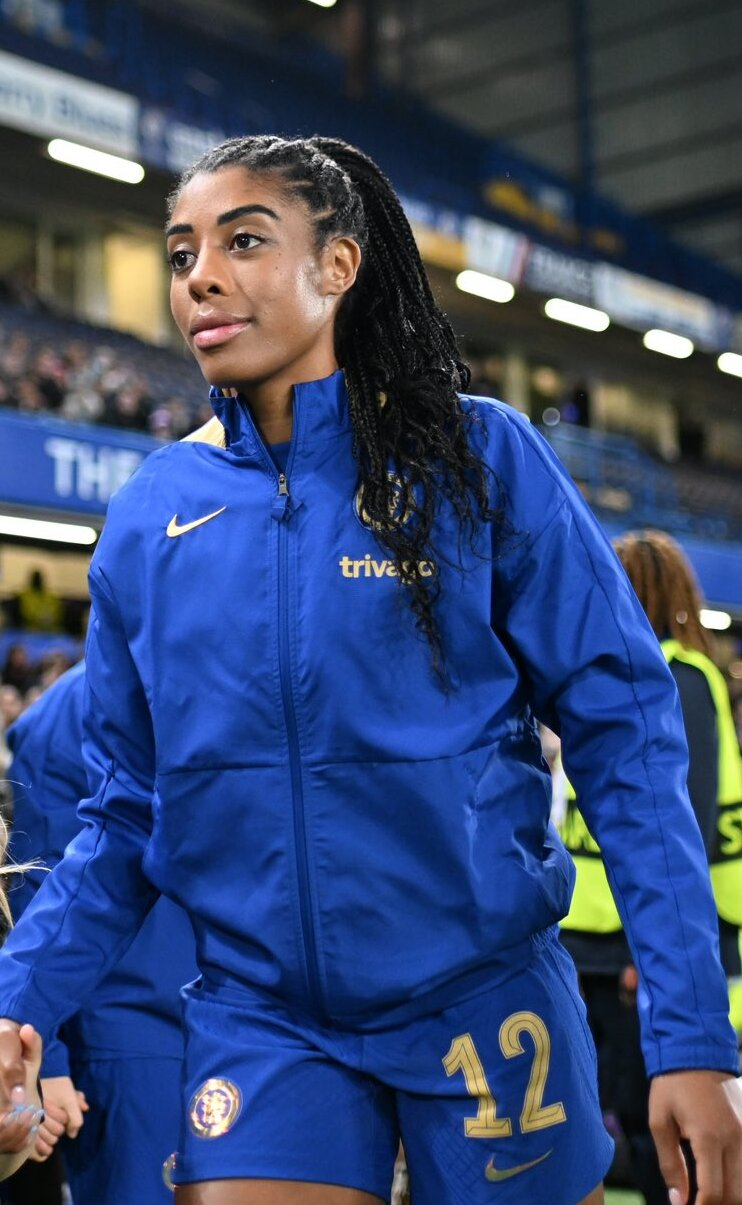
Ashley Lawrence

- George Lagogianes – news anchor, reporter and TV personality
- Don Lake – actor and writer
- Maurice LaMarche – voice actor (Animaniacs, Pinky and the Brain, Tiny Toon Adventures)
- Heath Lamberts – theatre actor
- Laurene Landon – actress
- Michele Landsberg – journalist, author, public speaker, feminist and social activist
- Tory Lanez – rapper
- Richie Laryea – soccer player
- Mel Lastman – 62nd Mayor of Toronto; businessman
- Henry Lau – singer, musician, actor, and ex-member of South Korean boy band Super Junior M
- Ashley Lawrence – soccer player for the Canada national team
- Jack Layton – politician, leader of the federal New Democratic Party
- Mike Layton – municipal politician, son of Jack Layton
- Michael Lazarovitch – actor
- Stephen Leacock – writer, humourist
- Christine Peng-Peng Lee – Olympic and NCAA gymnast
- Dennis Lee – children's author, poet
- Geddy Lee – musician, lead singer of Rush
- Mark Lee – musician, former member of South Korean band NCT (group), Canadian South Korean singer
- Sook-Yin Lee – media personality
- Michael Lee-Chin – businessman, investor
- Manny Legace – former NHL player
- Peter C. Lemon – recipient of the Medal of Honor
- E.J. Lennox – architect
- Sean Leon – rapper
- Dan Lett – actor
- David Levin – Israeli ice hockey player
- Baruch Levine – singer and entertainer
- Alex "Mine Boy" Levinsky (1910–1990) – NHL hockey player
- Tamara Levitt – author, mindfulness instructor, and voice over artist most widely known as the narrator for the Calm app
- Dan Levy – TV host and actor
- Avi Lewis – documentary filmmaker, broadcaster, and politician
- Dana Lewis – journalist
- Glenn Lewis – R&B singer
- Ivor Lewis – sculptor
- Larnell Lewis – musician
- Marc Lewis – neuroscientist and author
- Sharon Lewis – journalist
- Stephen Lewis – former UN Special Envoy for HIV/AIDS in Africa, former politician, humanitarian and academic
- Tau Lewis – artist
- Alex Lifeson – musician, guitarist of Rush
- Lights – musician
- Thea Lim – writer
- Elena Lobsanova – ballet dancer
- Jason Logan – illustrator, writer, graphic designer, and art director
- Robert K. Logan – author and academic
- Bob Lorimer – former NHL player
- Steve Ludzik – former NHL player
- James Lumbers – painter
- Erica Luttrell – actress
- Laurie Lynd – Canadian screenwriter and director
- George Seymour Lyon – gold medalist in golf at St. Louis Olympics 1904; reigning champion for 112 years

== M ==
- Raine Maida – Musician - Lead singer in Our Lady Peace
- Eddie MacCabe – sports journalist and writer
- Ann-Marie MacDonald – playwright, novelist, actor and journalist
- J. E. H. MacDonald – Group of Seven artist
- Norm Macdonald – comic actor (Saturday Night Live)
- Daniel MacIvor – playwright, actor and theatre/film director
- Steve Mackall – voice actor
- William Lyon Mackenzie – first Mayor of Toronto; first president of the Republic of Canada; a leader in the Upper Canada Rebellion
- John Macleod – biochemist and physiologist
- Margaret MacMillan – historian and expert of leader international relationships
- Maestro – hip-hop musician
- Daniel Magder – actor
- Christine Magee – spokesperson and co-founder of Sleep Country Canada
- Arnaud Maggs – artist
- Jamaal Magloire – former NBA player
- Kevin Maguire – former NHL player
- Victor Malarek – journalist
- Giorgio Mammoliti – municipal politician
- Manafest – Christian rapper/singer-songwriter
- Erik Mana – magician
- Howie Mandel – actor, comedian, writer, producer
- Dylan Mandlsohn – stand-up comedian
- Peter Mansbridge – CBC News chief correspondent
- Jay Manuel – make-up artist/fashion photographer
- Lisa Marcos – actress (Played, The Listener)
- Simon Marcus – kickboxer
- Hector Marinaro – soccer coach and former forward
- Rob Marinaro – soccer coach and former goalkeeper
- Amanda Marshall – singer-songwriter
- Ruth Marshall – actress (Flashpoint)
- Mae Martin – comedian, writer, actor (Feel Good)
- Russell Martin – MLB player
- Dennis Maruk – former NHL player
- Ron Marzel – lawyer
- James Mason – banker, Senator and soldier
- Mark Masri – tenor and gospel singer
- Mena Massoud – actor
- Raymond Massey – actor
- Vincent Massey – 18th Governor General of Canada
- Walter Massey – actor
- Pat Mastroianni – actor (Degrassi franchise)
- Cameron Mathison – actor
- Bruce Mau – designer (S,M,L,XL)
- James Mavor – economist and social figure
- Brad May – former NHL player
- Sanaz Mazinani – artist
- Rachel McAdams – actress
- Wallace McCain – McCain foods and Maple leaf foods
- Sheila McCarthy – actress
- Eric McCormack – actor (Will and Grace)
- Ernest McCulloch – cellular biologist
- Dean McDermott – actor and reality show personality (Tori & Dean: Inn Love)
- Bruce McDonald – film director
- Kevin McDonald – comedian, actor, member of The Kids in the Hall
- Michael McGowan – film director
- Summer McIntosh – Olympic medalist in swimming
- Don McKellar – actor, screenwriter and film director
- Ella N. McLean, Countess Norraikow – author and metaphysician
- Seaton McLean – film and TV producer
- Marshall McLuhan – academic and writer (Understanding Media)
- Evgenia Medvedeva – Russian figure skater
- Gerry Meehan – former NHL player
- Shawn Mendes – musician, singer
- Heather Menzies – actress (The Sound of Music)
- Lindsay G Merrithew – actor, producer, fitness entrepreneur
- Lorne Michaels – producer and creator of Saturday Night Live
- Michie Mee – hip hop musician
- Rick Middleton – former NHL player
- Ramona Milano – actress (Due South)
- Liam Millar – soccer player
- Greg Millen – former NHL player
- Kamal Miller – soccer player
- Minhi Wang – drag performer and model
- David Mirvish – theatrical impresario
- Ed Mirvish – theatrical impresario, founder of Honest Ed's
- Rohinton Mistry – writer
- Stacie Mistysyn – actress (Degrassi franchise)
- Joni Mitchell – musician
- Kim Mitchell – musician
- Shay Mitchell – actress
- Colin Mochrie – actor and improvisational comedian (Whose Line Is It Anyway?)
- Geraldine Moodie – photographer
- Corteon Moore – actor
- Dora Mavor Moore – founder of Canada's professional theater
- Mavor Moore – pioneer of Canadian television
- Rick Moranis – actor, comedian, writer, producer
- Ashtone Morgan – soccer player who represented the Canadian national team
- Jeffrey Morgan – writer, photographer, authorized biographer (Alice Cooper, Iggy Pop & The Stooges)
- Raymond Moriyama – architect
- Greg Morris – Canadian football player
- Dylan Moscovitch – Olympic medalist pair skater
- James Motluk – filmmaker
- Murray Douglas Morton – lawyer, trustee and chair of Toronto Board of Education, Member of Parliament
- Farley Mowat – writer
- Mr. Attic – hip hop musician
- Rania El Mugammar – writer, educator, activist
- Hope Muir – artistic director designate of National Ballet of Canada
- Craig Muni – former NHL player
- Peter Munk – founder of Barrick Gold
- Robert Munsch – children's author
- Mike Murphy – former NHL player
- Anne Murray – singer
- Mathew Murray – writer, web series creator
- Barton Myers – architect
- Mike Myers – comic actor (Saturday Night Live, Austin Powers)
- Alannah Myles – singer
- Mysterion the Mind Reader – mentalist

== N ==
- Mark Napier – former NHL player
- Nash the Slash – musician
- Nasri – pop singer
- Nav – musician and record producer
- Natasha Negovanlis – actress, singer and songwriter
- Daniel Negreanu – professional poker player
- Donald Gordon Medd Nelson – 23rd Canadian Surgeon General
- David Nemirovsky – former NHL player
- Lance Nethery – former NHL player
- John Neville – English actor
- Kevin Newman – journalist and news anchor
- Evelyn Ng – professional poker player
- Andrew Nicholson – National Basketball Association, Orlando Magic
- Jayde Nicole – model and former Playboy Playmate
- Danny Nykoluk – former CFL player
- Mike Nykoluk – former NHL player

== O ==
- Ed Ochiena – Canadian football player
- Kardinal Offishall – rapper/record producer
- Peanuts O'Flaherty – NHL player
- Heather Ogden – principal dancer with the National Ballet of Canada
- Catherine O'Hara – comedic actress (SCTV, Beetlejuice, Best in Show)
- Mary Margaret O'Hara – singer/songwriter
- Sidney Olcott – director
- Jamie Oleksiak – NHL player
- Penny Oleksiak – swimmer, Olympic gold medallist
- Kelly Olynyk – NBA player for the Toronto Raptors
- Bryan Lee O'Malley – cartoonist (Scott Pilgrim)
- Mohamed Omar – soccer player who represented the Somalia national team
- Michael Ondaatje – Booker Prize-winning writer (The English Patient)
- Kenneth Oppel – author (Silverwing saga, Airborn trilogy)
- Alexandra Orlando – gymnast
- Johnny Orlando – singer
- Mark Osborne – former NHL player
- Jonathan Osorio – soccer player
- Peter Outerbridge – actor
- Seiji Ozawa – conductor

== P ==
- Charles Pachter – artist
- Owen Pallett – violinist and singer
- Mike Palmateer – former NHL player
- Jesse Palmer – NFL football player and reality show personality (The Bachelor)
- Alice Panikian – model and Miss Universe Canada 2006
- Rachel Parent – activist
- Sarina Paris – dance/pop singer-songwriter
- Brad Park – former NHL player
- Gerard Parkes – Irish-born actor
- Amy Parkinson – poet
- John Part – three times World Darts Champion in both the PDC and BDO
- Tom Pashby – ophthalmologist, sport safety advocate and chairman of the Canadian Standards Association
- Alyy Patel – LGBTQ+ activist and writer
- Larry Patey – former NHL player
- Steve Payne – former NHL player
- Peaches – musician
- Miranda de Pencier – director film and TV
- Lester B. Pearson – 14th Prime Minister of Canada; 1957 Nobel Peace Prize laureate
- Michael Peca – former NHL player
- Adam Pelech – NHL player
- Mike Pelyk – former NHL player
- Miklos Perlus – actor, screenwriter
- Russell Peters – comedian
- Vera Peters OC – scientist, oncologist
- Luca Petrasso – soccer player
- Michael Petrasso – soccer player
- Adrian Petriw – actor
- Michael Pezzetta – NHL player
- Parichay (singer) – Bollywood/ Hip Hop/ R&B and Pop music producer and artist
- Nathan Phillips – 52nd Mayor of Toronto
- Rina Piccolo – cartoonist
- Mary Pickford – actress, co-founder of United Artists
- Alex Pierzchalski – CFL player
- Cara Pifko – actress
- Alison Pill – actress
- Lido Pimienta – Polaris Prize winning musician and artist
- Alex Pirus – former NHL player
- Christopher Plummer – actor
- Jeremy Podeswa – film director
- John Charles Polanyi – 1986 Nobel Prize in Chemistry
- Brett Polegato – Grammy Award-winning operatic baritone
- Sarah Polley – actress, screenwriter and film director (Away from Her)
- Carole Pope – rock singer
- Anna Porter – publisher
- Chris Potter – actor (Kung Fu: The Legend Continues), musician, pitchman
- Russ Powers – former politician
- Victoria Pratt – actress
- Robert Priest – poet, children's author and singer/songwriter
- Alice Priestley – children's writer and illustrator
- Jason Priestley – actor (Beverly Hills, 90210)
- Uno Prii – architect

== Q ==
- Bill Quackenbush – former NHL player
- Joel Quarrington – musician (Toronto Symphony Orchestra, National Arts Centre Orchestra)
- Paul Quarrington – author, screenwriter and musician
- Quinn – soccer player

== R ==
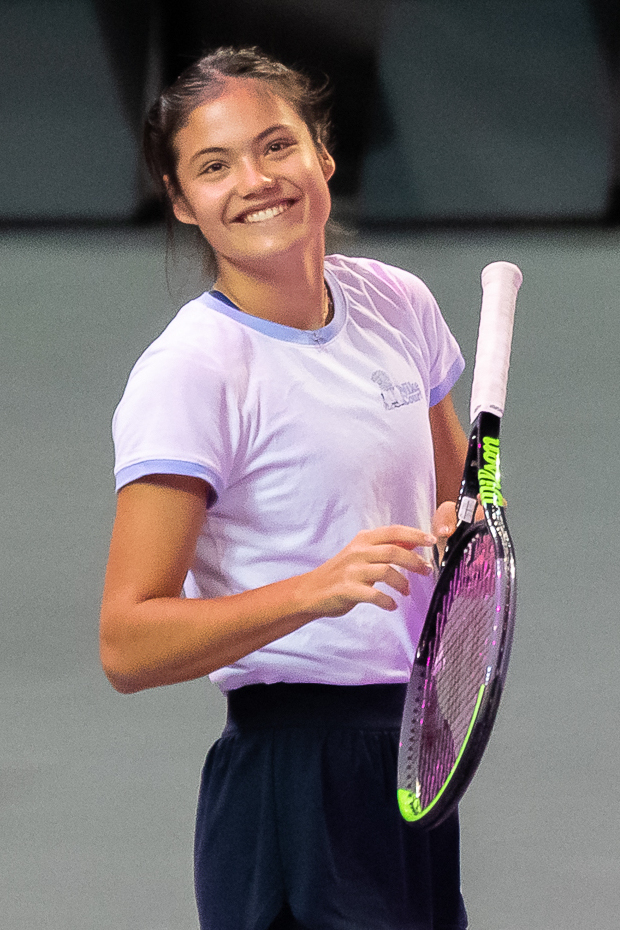
- Emma Raducanu
  Emma Raducanu – tennis player
- Kyle Rae – consultant, former municipal politician
- Raghav – singer
- Nisha Rajagopal – singer
- David Rakoff – author
- James Randi – magician
- Milos Raonic – tennis player
- Dennis Raphael – professor
- Leo Rautins – broadcaster and former NBA player
- Lisa Ray – actress
- Raheel Raza – author
- Michael Redhill – writer
- Keanu Reeves – actor
- Albert Reichmann – businessman
- Paul Reichmann – businessman
- Noah Reid – actor
- Ivan Reitman – director
- John Relyea – opera singer
- Renforshort – singer
- Liisa Repo-Martel – actress
- Gloria Reuben – actress
- Jessie Reyez – singer
- Nino Ricci – writer
- Spencer Rice – actor/entertainer (Kenny vs Spenny)
- Daniel Richler – broadcaster and writer
- Sandie Rinaldo – journalist, TV anchor for CTV News
- Roam – Musician
- Anastasia Rizikov – pianist
- Martin Roach – actor
- John D. Roberts – news anchor for Fox News Channel
- Megan Roberts – gymnast for the Georgia Gym Dogs
- Robbie Robertson – musician
- Coco Rocha – model
- Edward "Ted" Rogers – founder and CEO of Rogers Communications
- Edward S. Rogers III – Chairman of Rogers Communications and Rogers Control Trust
- Edward S. Rogers Sr. – Rogers batteryless radio, genius inventor
- Rino Romano – actor, voice actor
- Bobby Roode – professional wrestler
- Goody Rosen – former MLB player
- Lukas Rossi – singer
- Marty Roth – race car driver
- Andrew Rotilio – actor
- Jackson Rowe - basketball player
- The Royal Canadian Air Farce – comedy troupe
- Jan Rubeš – opera singer and actor
- Baņuta Rubess – playwright and theatre director
- Anna Russell – concert comedian
- Ann Rutherford – actress

== S ==
- Jamie Salter - businessman; founder, chairman and CEO of Authentic Brands Group
- Moshe Safdie – architect
- Morley Safer – journalist (60 Minutes)
- F. A. Sampson – war hero (RCAF WWII)
- Saukrates – hip hop musician
- John Ralston Saul – writer
- Booth Savage – actor
- Tyrone Savage – actor (Wind at My Back)
- Monika Schnarre – supermodel and actress
- Kim Schraner – actress (Spynet)
- Albert Schultz – actor, director and the founding artistic director of Toronto's Soulpepper Theatre Company
- Linda Schuyler – television producer (Degrassi franchise)
- Caterina Scorsone – actress
- Emma Priscilla Scott – educator and author
- Sara Seager – astronomer and planetary scientist
- Michael Seater – actor
- Lance Secretan – leadership theorist, writer and consultant
- Derek Sharp – lead singer for The Guess Who
- Isadore Sharp – businessman
- Ken Shaw – former CTV news anchor
- Domee Shi – Academy Award-winning director (Bao, Turning Red)
- Howard Shore – Academy Award-winning film composer (The Lord of the Rings)
- Martin Short – actor
- Frank Shuster – comedian (Wayne and Shuster)
- Joe Shuster – creator of Superman
- Rosie Shuster – writer
- Steve Shutt – former NHL player
- Jane Siberry – musician
- Khaleel Seivwright – carpenter and activist
- Carmen Silvera – actress ('Allo 'Allo!)
- John Graves Simcoe – first Lieutenant Governor of Upper Canada; founder of the town of York (now Toronto)
- Al Sims – former NHL player
- Gail Simmons – food author, cookbook writer and judge on TV series Top Chef
- Gordon Sinclair – journalist, writer and commentator
- Lilly Singh – actress, motivational speaker, model, rapper, vlogger, comedian and founder of Girllove
- Darryl Sittler – former NHL player
- Rachel Skarsten – actress (Birds of Prey, Lost Girl)
- Inga Skaya – Miss Universe Canada 2007
- Josef Škvorecký – writer
- Amy Sky – country singer
- Willis C. Silverthorn – Wisconsin politician
- Colin Simpson – author
- Chantal Singer – internationally ranked competitive water skier
- Smiley – rapper
- Glenn Smith – former NHL player
- Gregory Smith – actor
- Reginald "Hooley" Smith – former NHL player
- Sid Smith – former NHL player
- Steve Smith – comedian, actor and writer
- Sonja Smits – Canadian actress
- Snow – musician
- Michael Snow – artist
- James Sommerville – hornist and conductor
- David Soren – film director
- Jason Spezza – NHL player
- Fred Stanfield – former NHL player
- Larry M. Starr – consultant, academic administrator, university professor, and research scientist
- Jessica Steen – actress
- Shelley Steiner – Olympic fencer
- Mark Steyn – journalist
- Amanda Stepto – actress (Degrassi franchise)
- Rob Stewart (actor) – actor
- Rob Stewart (filmmaker) – filmmaker
- Stephen Stohn – television producer (Degrassi franchise)
- Elvis Stojko – former Olympic figure skater
- John Strachan – first Anglican Bishop of Toronto; founder of Trinity College at the University of Toronto
- David Stratas – Justice of the Federal Court of Appeal
- Diane Stratas – former Member of Parliament for Scarborough Centre (electoral district)
- Teresa Stratas – opera singer
- Trish Stratus (born Patrica Stratigias) – former WWE wrestler and fitness model
- Tara Strong – voice actress, actress and singer (Rugrats, The New Batman Adventures, Teen Titans, The Fairly OddParents, The Powerpuff Girls)
- Les Stroud – survivalist
- George Stroumboulopoulos – TV/radio personality and VJ
- Malcolm Subban – NHL player
- P.K. Subban – former NHL player
- Charlotte Sullivan – actress
- Jack Sullivan – journalist for The Canadian Press
- Kevin Sullivan – writer, director and producer (Anne of Green Gables, Road to Avonlea, Wind at My Back)
- Moez Surani – poet

== T ==
- Rick Tabaracci – former NHL player
- Jeremy Taggart – musician, drummer
- Samantha Tajik – Miss Universe Canada 2008
- Brandon Tanev – NHL player
- Chris Tanev – NHL player
- Tony Tanti – former NHL player
- Don Tapscott – writer and consultant, technology and business
- John Tavares – lacrosse player
- Mark Taylor – actor (Student Bodies, Flashpoint)
- R. Dean Taylor – singer/songwriter ("Indiana Wants Me")
- Tamara Taylor – actress
- Tanya Taylor – Canadian fashion designer
- Kat Teasdale – auto racing driver
- Amy Shira Teitel – writer and spaceflight historian
- Ty Templeton – cartoonist and writer
- Menaka Thakkar – dancer, choreographer
- Colin Thatcher – politician and convicted murderer
- David Thomson – Canada's wealthiest person; media magnate; 3rd Baron Thomson of Fleet
- Peter Thompson – rally race car driver with Thomson Motorsport and venture capitalist
- Kenneth Thomson – media magnate and art collector; 2nd Baron Thomson of Fleet
- R. H. Thomson – actor (Road to Avonlea)
- Roy Thomson – media magnate; 1st Baron Thomson of Fleet
- Tom Thomson – Group of Seven artist
- Claire Thompson – ice hockey player for the Vancouver Goldeneyes, Olympic gold medalist
- Judith Thompson – playwright
- Tristan Thompson – power forward/center, Cleveland Cavaliers
- James E. Till – biophysicist
- Frederick Albert Tilston – recipient of the Victoria Cross
- Morris Titanic – former NHL player
- Frederick George Topham – recipient of the Victoria Cross
- Raffi Torres – NHL player
- Talan Torriero – actor (Laguna Beach: The Real Orange County)
- John Tory – 65th mayor of Toronto
- Paul Tracy – 2003 Champ Car champion
- Justin Trottier – commentator and atheist leader
- Endel Tulving – cognitive psychologist, world authority on human memory function
- Sheldon Turcott – journalist
- Slim Twig – singer

== U ==
- Katherine Uchida – rhythmic gymnast
- Richard Underhill – jazz musician
- Jane Urquhart – author

== V ==
- Ali Velshi – television journalist and anchor for NBC News and MSNBC
- Billy Van – comedian, actor and singer
- Laura Vandervoort – actress (Smallville)
- Pieter Vanden Bos – former CFL player
- Nia Vardalos – actress and writer, stage and film (My Big Fat Greek Wedding)
- Gabriel Varga – kickboxer
- George Vari – developer and philanthropist
- M. G. Vassanji – author
- Mike Veisor – former NHL player
- Kim Venn – astrophysicist and professor
- Carter Verhaeghe – NHL player
- John Verwey – darts player
- Steve Vickers – former NHL player
- Nerene Virgin – actress, journalist and teacher
- Adnan Virk – sports anchor
- David Visentin – real estate agent, Love It or List It
- Joey Votto – MLB player
- Prvoslav Vujcic – author

== W ==
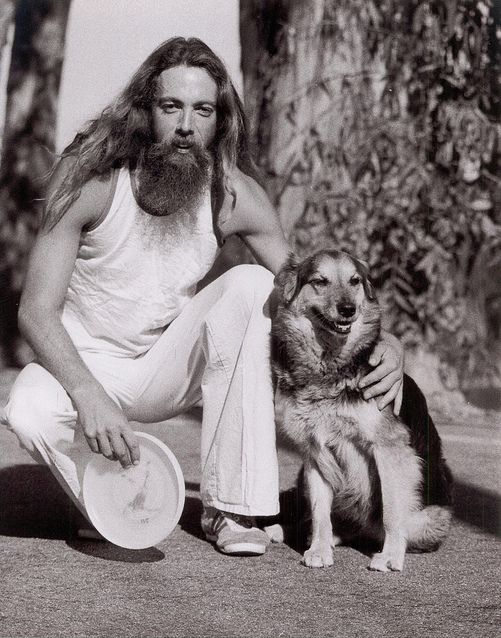
Ken Westerfield helped to popularize Frisbee as an alternative disc sport in the 1960s and 70s.

- The Weeknd – singer-songwriter, actor and director
- Sara Waisglass – actress
- George F. Walker – playwright
- Pamela Wallin – Senator, former Canadian Consul-General to New York
- Jake Walman – NHL player
- Joel Ward – former NHL player
- Yasmin Warsame – supermodel
- Alberta Watson – actress
- Tom Watt – former NHL coach
- Daryl Watts – ice hockey player for the Toronto Sceptres
- Al Waxman – actor
- Johnny Wayne – comedian (of Wayne and Shuster)
- Kevin Weekes – broadcaster and former NHL player
- Samantha Weinstein – actress
- Stephen Weiss – former NHL player
- Danny Wells – actor (The Jeffersons) and voice actor
- Wendy – member of South Korean girl group Red Velvet
- Ken Westerfield – disc sports (Frisbee) pioneer, competitor, showman, promoter
- Galen Weston – Canada's second wealthiest man
- Galen Weston Jr. – businessman
- Denis Whitaker – commanded 1st Battalion The Royal Hamilton Light Infantry in the Second World War
- Hobart Johnstone Whitley – real-estate developer, "Father of Hollywood"
- Zoe Whittall – Giller Prize-nominated author
- Ben Wicks – cartoonist, illustrator, journalist and author
- Joyce Wieland – filmmaker
- Andrew Wiggins – NBA player for the Golden State Warriors, first overall draft pick in 2014 by the Cleveland Cavaliers before getting traded to the Minnesota Timberwolves on draft night
- Brian Wilks (born 1966) – NHL hockey player
- Healey Willan – composer
- Elyse Willems – internet personality, comedian, writer
- Angel Williams – TNA Knockout pro wrestler
- Fred Williams – journalist, historian
- Genelle Williams – actress
- Harland Williams – actor
- Richard Williams – animator (of Who Framed Roger Rabbit and The Thief and the Cobbler)
- Bree Williamson – actress
- Behn Wilson – former NHL player
- Dunc Wilson – former NHL player
- Michael Wilson – former federal Minister of Finance (1984–1991), former Canadian Ambassador to the United States (2006–2009)
- Murray Wilson – former NHL player
- Ron Wilson – former NHL player
- Ross "Lefty" Wilson – former NHL player
- Tom Wilson – NHL player for the Washington Capitals
- Jeff Wincott – actor (Night Heat)
- Michael Wincott – actor
- Katheryn Winnick – actress
- Daniel Winnik – NHL player
- Maurice Dean Wint – actor
- Ralph E. Winters – film editor (Ben-Hur)
- Maria Torrence Wishart – medical illustrator and the founder of the University of Toronto's Art as Applied to Medicine program
- Karl Wolf – pop singer
- Ellen Wong – actress
- Julielynn Wong – physician, scientist and pilot
- Kristyn Wong-Tam – municipal politician
- Jay Woodcroft – ice hockey coach
- Cam Woolley – former safety and traffic news reporter for CP24
- D'Pharaoh Woon-A-Tai – (born 2001) actor
- Hawksley Workman – singer-songwriter
- Roy "Shrimp" Worters – former NHL player
- Kathleen Wynne – 25th Premier of Ontario

== Y ==
- Sura Yekka – soccer player for Canada
- Yoon Keeho – member of South Korean boy group P1HARMONY
- Alissa York – writer
- Howie Young – former NHL player
- Neil Young – rock musician
- Renee Young – host of multiple WWE programs
- Scott Young – sportswriter, journalist and novelist; father of Neil Young
- Warren Young – former NHL player
- Andrew Younghusband – TV personality, writer and journalist
- David Yudelman – South African-born writer
- Catalina Yue – singer

== Z ==
- Saad Bin Zafar – professional cricket player
- Zanta – performance artist
- Ron Zanussi – former NHL player
- Zappacosta – singer-songwriter
- Brigitte Zarie – jazz singer-songwriter
- Paul Zaza – film score musician and songwriter
- Eberhard Zeidler – architect
- Peter Zezel – former NHL player
- Moses Znaimer – media mogul (CHUM, founder of Citytv)
- Robert J. Zydenbos – scholar in Indology and philosophy
- Zeds Dead – electronic music DJ duo

== See also ==
- List of mayors of Toronto
- List of people from Ontario
