= Severn Cullis-Suzuki =

Canadian environmental activist

Severn Suzuki
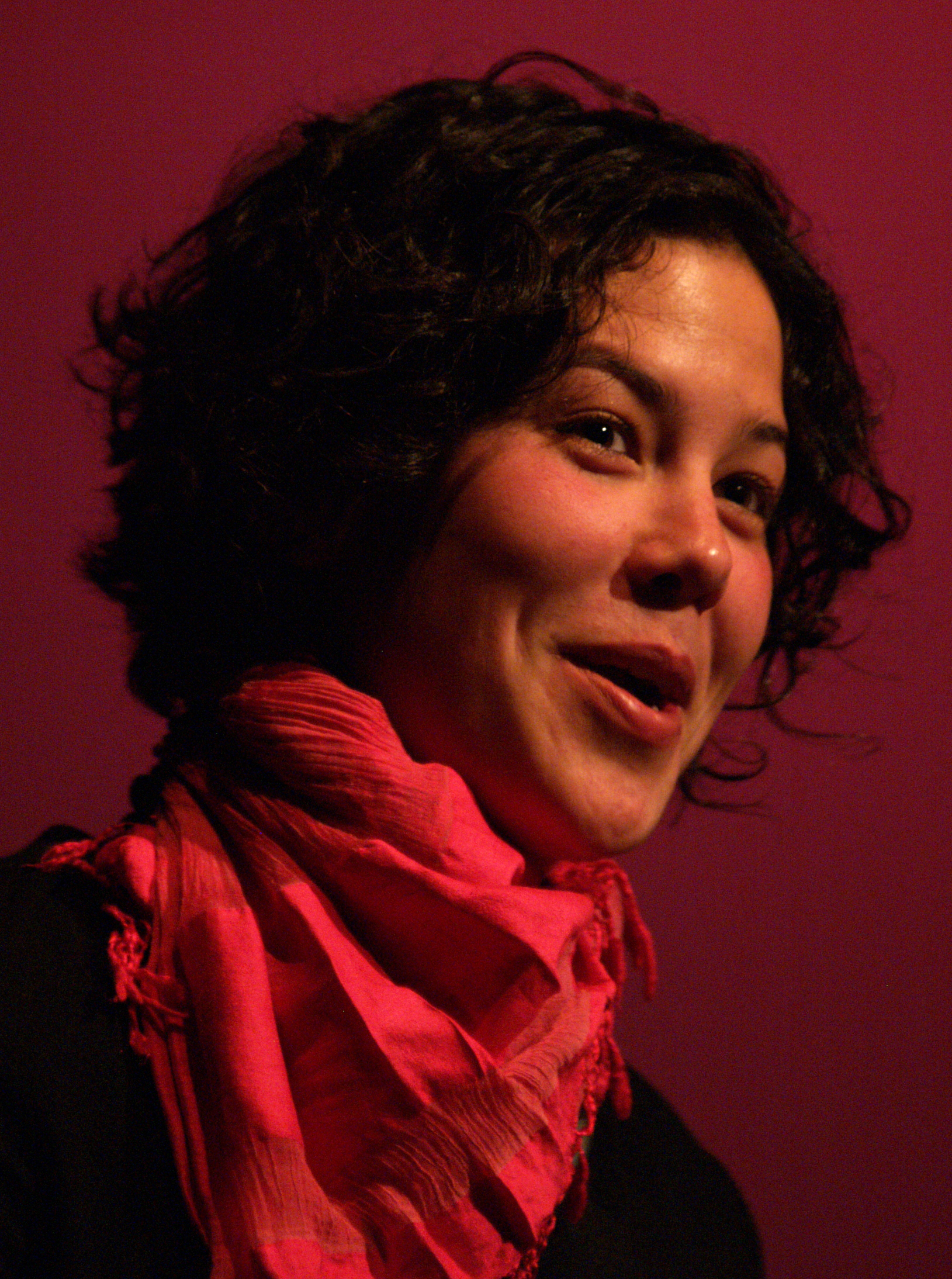
- Cullis-Suzuki speaking at the University of Alberta in October 2006
- Born: 30 November 1979 (age 46); Vancouver, British Columbia, Canada
- Citizenship: Canadian
- Education: Yale University, University of Victoria
- Occupations: Environmental activist, speaker, television host, author
- Father: David Suzuki

Severn Cullis-Suzuki (born 30 November 1979) is a Canadian environmental activist and writer. She has spoken around the world about environmental issues, urging listeners to define their values, act with the future in mind and take individual responsibility. She is the daughter of Canadian environmentalist David Suzuki.

== Biography ==
Severn Cullis-Suzuki was born and raised in Vancouver, British Columbia. Her mother is writer Tara Cullis. Her father, geneticist and environmental activist David Suzuki, is a third-generation Japanese Canadian. While attending Lord Tennyson Elementary School in French Immersion, at age 9, she founded the Environmental Children's Organization (ECO), a group of children dedicated to learning and teaching other youngsters about environmental issues. In 1992, at age 12, Cullis-Suzuki raised money with members of ECO to attend the Earth Summit in Rio de Janeiro. Along with group members Michelle Quigg, Vanessa Suttie, and Morgan Geisler, Cullis-Suzuki presented environmental issues from a youth perspective at the summit, where she was applauded for a speech to the delegates. The video has since become a viral hit, popularly known as "The Girl Who Silenced the World for 5 Minutes".

In 1993, she was honoured in the United Nations Environment Programme's Global 500 Roll of Honour. In 1993, Doubleday published her book Tell the World, a 32-page book of environmental steps for families.

Cullis-Suzuki graduated from Yale University in 2002 with a B.S. in ecology and evolutionary biology. After Yale, Cullis-Suzuki spent two years travelling. Cullis-Suzuki co-hosted Suzuki's Nature Quest, a children's television series that aired on Discovery Kids in 2002.

In early 2002, she helped launch an Internet-based think tank called The Skyfish Project. As a member of Kofi Annan's Special Advisory Panel, she and members of the Skyfish Project brought their first project, a pledge called the "Recognition of Responsibility", to the World Summit on Sustainable Development in Johannesburg in August 2002. The Skyfish Project disbanded in 2004 as Cullis-Suzuki turned her focus back to school. She enrolled in a graduate program at the University of Victoria to study ethnobotany under Nancy Turner, finishing in 2007.

Cullis-Suzuki is the main character in the documentary film Severn, the Voice of Our Children, directed by Jean-Paul Jaud and released theatrically in France on November 10, 2010.

Cullis-Suzuki is an Earth Charter International Council Member.

== Personal life ==
Married in 2008, Cullis-Suzuki lived with her husband and two sons in Haida Gwaii, British Columbia, until August 2021. She moved to Vancouver, BC in order to start her new role as the Executive Director of the David Suzuki Foundation, which she began in September 2021.

She is related to two NHL players, Nick Suzuki and Ryan Suzuki.

== Cultural tributes ==
In 2009, French guitarist MattRach and his band used extracts from her 1992 speech in their track Human Bullshit.
In 2010, French DJ Laurent Wolf used her 1992 speech to turn it into a track : 2012 - Not The End Of The World.
In 2016, NINSKEEN used part of her speech in the title Make Your Actions Reflect Your Words.
In 2017, the French group Grands Boulevards used an excerpt from her speech in the track Children of Light 8.
In 2017, the French group Way For Nothing used her speech in the title Consciousness.
In 2016 and 2018, the French musician Owen Le Guen used excerpts from her speech in the tracks Before Our Eyes and They Exist.
In 2018, a few lines of her speech can be heard from the vertical version of Alan Walker's Different World music video.
In 2018, Louise Tilleke painted a portrait of Severn Cullis-Suzuki which she presented in her Parisian exhibition entitled Ask not the Earth….
In 2020, more than 20 animation directors, under the artistic supervision of Simone Giampaolo, transposed her speech into a short film named Only a Child, which they describe as "a visual poem". It won the Ray Harryhausen Award for best animated short film.
In 2022, for the thirtieth anniversary, the artist Selfish Patterns uses parts of the speech in the track 1992.

== See also ==
- Greta Thunberg – as a minor is also notable as an environmental activist since 2018
- Licypriya Kangujam – Indian child environmental activist
- Rachel Parent – activist who challenges Genetically Modified Organisms (GMOs) in food
