= August 9 =

August 9 this year in various calendars
- Sunday, 9 August 2026
Akan	Fokwasi
Armenian	20 Nawasardi 1476
Aztec	Pānquetzaliztli 11, 4 Quiyahuitl
Babylonian	25 Du'uzu, 2337 SE
Balinese pawukon	Menga, Pasah, Sri, Pon, Tungleh, Redite of Tambir, Ludra, Urungan, Suka
Bengali	25 Shrabon, BS 1433
Chinese	Yin Wood Rabbit・Hairy Head Mansion; Fire Horse Year, Month 6, Day 27 (Liqiu, 14 days until Chushu)
Common Era	9 August 2026 CE
Coptic	3 Mesori, AM 1742
Egyptian	25 Choiak, 2775 NE
Ethiopian	3 Naḥasē, 2018 Amätä Məhrät
French Republican	Décade III, Duodi de Thermidor de l'Année 234 de la République
Gregorian	9 August, AD 2026
Hebrew	26 Av, AM 5786
Hindu	Mṛgaśiras・Vyāghāta; Solar: 24 Śrāvaṇa, 1948 SE; Lunisolar: Ekādaśī, Kṛishna pakṣa of Āṣāḍha, 2083 VE; Rāudra・5127 KY・1,872,796
Icelandic	Sunnudagur, 15 Heyannir 2026
Islamic	24 Safar, AH 1448 (using tabular method)
ISO week date	2026-W32-7
Japanese	27 Minazuki, Reiwa 8 (Risshū, 14 days until Shosho)
Julian	27 July, AD 2026 (AM 7534)
Julian day	2461262
Korean	27 Yangdal, 4359 DE
Maya	13.0.13.14.19; 12 Yaxkin, 4 Cauac
Roman	ante diem VI Kalendas Augustas, MMDCCLXXIX AUC
Solar Hijri	18 Mordad, SH 1405
Tibetan	26 chu stod, me pho rta 2153 or 1772 or 1000

<<	August					>>
Su	Mo	Tu	We	Th	Fr	Sa
						1
2	3	4	5	6	7	8
9	10	11	12	13	14	15
16	17	18	19	20	21	22
23	24	25	26	27	28	29
30	31
2026

August 9 in recent years
2026 (Sunday)
2025 (Saturday)
2024 (Friday)
2023 (Wednesday)
2022 (Tuesday)
2021 (Monday)
2020 (Sunday)
2019 (Friday)
2018 (Thursday)
2017 (Wednesday)

August 9 is the 221st day of the year (222nd in leap years) in the Gregorian calendar; 144 days remain until the end of the year.

== Events ==
=== Pre-1600 ===
- 48 BC – Caesar's Civil War: Battle of Pharsalus: Julius Caesar decisively defeats Pompey at Pharsalus and Pompey flees to Egypt.
- 378 – Gothic War: Battle of Adrianople: A large Roman army led by Emperor Valens is defeated by the Visigoths. Valens is killed along with over half of his army.
- 1173 – Construction of the campanile of the Cathedral of Pisa (now known as the Leaning Tower of Pisa) begins; it will take two centuries to complete.
- 1329 – Quilon, the first Indian Christian Diocese, is erected by Pope John XXII; the French-born Jordanus is appointed the first Bishop.
- 1500 – Ottoman–Venetian War (1499–1503): The Ottomans capture Methoni, Messenia.

=== 1601–1900 ===
- 1610 – The First Anglo-Powhatan War begins in colonial Virginia.
- 1638 – An army under Bernard of Saxe-Weimar defeats imperial troops at the battle of Wittenweiher.
- 1810 – Napoleon annexes Westphalia as part of the First French Empire.
- 1814 – American Indian Wars: The Creek sign the Treaty of Fort Jackson, giving up huge parts of Alabama and Georgia.
- 1830 – Louis Philippe becomes the king of the French following abdication of Charles X.
- 1842 – The Webster–Ashburton Treaty is signed, establishing the United States–Canada border east of the Rocky Mountains.
- 1854 – American Transcendentalist philosopher Henry David Thoreau publishes his memoir Walden.
- 1855 – Åland War: The Battle of Suomenlinna begins.
- 1862 – American Civil War: Battle of Cedar Mountain: At Cedar Mountain, Virginia, Confederate General Stonewall Jackson narrowly defeats Union forces under General John Pope.
- 1877 – American Indian Wars: Battle of the Big Hole: A small band of Nez Percé Indians clash with the United States Army.
- 1892 – Thomas Edison receives a patent for a two-way telegraph.
- 1897 – The first International Congress of Mathematicians is held in Zürich, Switzerland.

=== 1901–present ===
- 1902 – Edward VII and Alexandra of Denmark are crowned King and Queen of the United Kingdom of Great Britain and Ireland.
- 1907 – The first Boy Scout encampment concludes at Brownsea Island in southern England.
- 1925 – A train robbery takes place in Kakori, near Lucknow, India, by the Indian independence revolutionaries, against the British government.
- 1936 – Summer Olympics: Jesse Owens wins his fourth gold medal at the games.
- 1942 – World War II: Battle of Savo Island: Allied naval forces protecting their amphibious forces during the initial stages of the Battle of Guadalcanal are surprised and defeated by an Imperial Japanese Navy cruiser force.
- 1942 – Dmitri Shostakovich's 7th symphony premieres in a besieged Leningrad.
- 1944 – The United States Forest Service and the Wartime Advertising Council release posters featuring Smokey Bear for the first time.
- 1944 – World War II: Continuation War: The Vyborg–Petrozavodsk Offensive, the largest offensive launched by Soviet Union against Finland during the Second World War, ends to a strategic stalemate. Both Finnish and Soviet troops at the Finnish front dig to defensive positions, and the front remains stable until the end of the war.
- 1945 – World War II: Nagasaki is devastated when an atomic bomb, Fat Man, is dropped by the United States B-29 Bockscar. Thirty-five thousand people are killed outright, including 23,200–28,200 Japanese war workers, 2,000 Korean forced workers, and 150 Japanese soldiers.
- 1945 – World War II: The Red Army invades Japanese-occupied Manchuria.
- 1960 – South Kasai secedes from the Congo.
- 1965 – The State of Singapore separates from the Malaysian federation due to a heated ideological conflict between their ruling parties.
- 1969 – Tate–LaBianca murders: Followers of Charles Manson murder pregnant actress Sharon Tate (wife of Roman Polanski), coffee heiress Abigail Folger, Polish actor Wojciech Frykowski, men's hairstylist Jay Sebring and recent high-school graduate Steven Parent.
- 1970 – LANSA Flight 502 crashes after takeoff from Alejandro Velasco Astete International Airport in Cusco, Peru, killing 99 of the 100 people on board, as well as two people on the ground.
- 1971 – The Troubles: In Northern Ireland, the British authorities launch Operation Demetrius. The operation involves the mass arrest and internment without trial of individuals suspected of being affiliated with the Irish Republican Army (PIRA). Mass riots follow, and thousands of people flee or are forced out of their homes.
- 1973 – Mars 7 is launched from the USSR.
- 1974 – As a direct result of the Watergate scandal, Richard Nixon becomes the first president of the United States to resign from office. Vice President Gerald Ford becomes president.
- 1979 – Female workers of YH Trading in South Korea hold a sit-in protest in response to the company's unilateral shutdown.
- 1991 – The Italian prosecuting magistrate Antonino Scopelliti is murdered by the 'Ndrangheta on behalf of the Sicilian Mafia while preparing the government's case in the final appeal of the Maxi Trial.
- 1993 – The Liberal Democratic Party of Japan loses a 38-year hold on national leadership.
- 1995 – Aviateca Flight 901 crashes into the San Vicente volcano in El Salvador, killing all 65 people on board.
- 1999 – Russian president Boris Yeltsin fires his prime minister, Sergei Stepashin, and for the fourth time fires his entire cabinet.
- 2006 – At least 21 suspected terrorists are arrested in the 2006 transatlantic aircraft plot that happened in the United Kingdom. The arrests are made in London, Birmingham, and High Wycombe in an overnight operation.
- 2007 – Air Moorea Flight 1121 crashes after takeoff from Moorea Airport in French Polynesia, killing all 20 people on board.
- 2012 – Shannon Eastin becomes the first woman to officiate an NFL game.
- 2013 – Gunmen open fire at a Sunni mosque in the city of Quetta killing at least ten people and injuring 30.
- 2014 – Michael Brown, an 18-year-old African American male in Ferguson, Missouri, is shot and killed by a Ferguson police officer after reportedly assaulting the officer and attempting to steal his weapon, sparking protests and unrest in the city.
- 2021 – The Tampere light rail officially starts operating.
- 2024 – Voepass Linhas Aéreas Flight 2283 crashes near Vinhedo, São Paulo, killing all 62 people on board.

== Births ==
=== Pre-1600 ===
- 1201 – Arnold Fitz Thedmar, English historian and merchant (died 1274)
- 1537 – Francesco Barozzi, Italian mathematician and astronomer (died 1604)
- 1544 – Bogislaw XIII, Duke of Pomerania (died 1606)
- 1590 – John Webster, colonial settler and governor of Connecticut (died 1661)
- 1593 – Izaak Walton, English biographer and author (The Compleat Angler) (died 1683)

=== 1601–1900 ===
- 1603 – Johannes Cocceius, German-Dutch theologian and academic (died 1669)
- 1611 – Henry of Nassau-Siegen, German count, officer in the Dutch Army, diplomat for the Dutch Republic (born 1611)
- 1648 – Johann Michael Bach, German composer (died 1694)
- 1653 – John Oldham, English poet and translator (died 1683)
- 1696 – Joseph Wenzel I, Prince of Liechtenstein (died 1772)
- 1722 – Prince Augustus William of Prussia (died 1758)
- 1726 – Francesco Cetti, Italian priest, zoologist, and mathematician (died 1778)
- 1748 – Bernhard Schott, German music publisher (died 1809)
- 1757 – Elizabeth Schuyler Hamilton, American humanitarian; wife of Alexander Hamilton (died 1854)
- 1757 – Thomas Telford, Scottish architect and engineer, designed the Menai Suspension Bridge (died 1834)
- 1776 – Amedeo Avogadro, Italian physicist and chemist (died 1856)
- 1783 – Grand Duchess Alexandra Pavlovna of Russia (died 1801)
- 1788 – Adoniram Judson, American missionary and lexicographer (died 1850)
- 1797 – Charles Robert Malden, English lieutenant and surveyor (died 1855)
- 1805 – Joseph Locke, English engineer and politician (died 1860)
- 1819 – Jonathan Homer Lane, American astrophysicist who mathematically analyzed the Sun as a gaseous body (died 1880)
- 1819 – William T. G. Morton, American dentist who first used ether as a surgical anaesthetic (died 1868)
- 1845 – André Bessette, Canadian saint (died 1937)
- 1847 – Maria Vittoria dal Pozzo, Queen Consort of King Amadeo I of Spain (died 1876)
- 1848 – Alfred David Benjamin, Australian-born businessman and philanthropist. (died 1900)
- 1861 – Dorothea Klumpke, American astronomer and academic (died 1942)
- 1867 – Evelina Haverfield, Scottish nurse and activist (died 1920)
- 1872 – Archduke Joseph August of Austria (died 1962)
- 1874 – Reynaldo Hahn, Venezuelan composer and conductor (died 1947)
- 1875 – Albert Ketèlbey, English pianist, composer, and conductor (died 1959)
- 1878 – Eileen Gray, Irish architect and furniture designer (died 1976)
- 1879 – John Willcock, Australian politician, 15th Premier of Western Australia, (died 1956)
- 1881 – Prince Antônio Gastão of Orléans-Braganza, Brazilian prince (died 1918)
- 1890 – Eino Kaila, Finnish philosopher and psychologist, attendant of the Vienna circle (died 1958)
- 1896 – Erich Hückel, German physicist and chemist (died 1980)
- 1896 – Jean Piaget, Swiss psychologist and philosopher (died 1980)
- 1897 – Ralph Wyckoff, American scientist and pioneer of X-ray crystallography (died 1994)
- 1899 – P. L. Travers, Australian-English author and actress (died 1996)
- 1900 – Charles Farrell, American actor and singer (died 1990)

=== 1901–present ===
- 1902 – Zino Francescatti, French violinist (died 1991)
- 1902 – Panteleimon Ponomarenko, Russian general and politician (died 1984)
- 1905 – Leo Genn, British actor and barrister (died 1978)
- 1909 – Vinayaka Krishna Gokak, Indian scholar, author, and academic (died 1992)
- 1909 – Willa Beatrice Player, American educator, first Black woman college president (died 2003)
- 1909 – Adam von Trott zu Solz, German lawyer and diplomat (died 1944)
- 1911 – William Alfred Fowler, American astronomer and astrophysicist, Nobel Laureate (died 1996)
- 1911 – Eddie Futch, American boxer and trainer (died 2001)
- 1911 – John McQuade, Northern Irish soldier, boxer, and politician (died 1984)
- 1913 – Wilbur Norman Christiansen, Australian astronomer and engineer (died 2007)
- 1914 – Ferenc Fricsay, Hungarian-Austrian conductor and director (died 1963)
- 1914 – Tove Jansson, Finnish author and illustrator (died 2001)
- 1914 – Joe Mercer, English footballer and manager (died 1990)
- 1915 – Mareta West, American astronomer and geologist (died 1998)
- 1918 – Kermit Beahan, American Air Force colonel (died 1989)
- 1918 – Giles Cooper, Irish soldier and playwright (died 1966)
- 1918 – Albert Seedman, American police officer (died 2013)
- 1919 – Joop den Uyl, Dutch journalist, economist, and politician, Prime Minister of the Netherlands (died 1987)
- 1919 – Ralph Houk, American baseball player and manager (died 2010)
- 1920 – Enzo Biagi, Italian journalist and author (died 2007)
- 1921 – Ernest Angley, American evangelist and author (died 2021)
- 1921 – J. James Exon, American soldier and politician, 33rd Governor of Nebraska (died 2005)
- 1922 – Philip Larkin, English poet and novelist (died 1985)
- 1924 – Mathews Mar Barnabas, Indian metropolitan (died 2012)
- 1924 – Frank Martínez, American soldier and painter (died 2013)
- 1925 – David A. Huffman, American computer scientist, developed Huffman coding (died 1999)
- 1926 – Denis Atkinson, Barbadian cricketer (died 2001)
- 1927 – Daniel Keyes, American short story writer and novelist (died 2014)
- 1927 – Marvin Minsky, American cognitive scientist, computer scientist, and pioneer in the field of artificial intelligence (died 2016)
- 1927 – Robert Shaw, English actor and screenwriter (died 1978)
- 1928 – Bob Cousy, American basketball player and coach
- 1928 – Camilla Wicks, American violinist and educator (died 2020)
- 1928 – Dolores Wilson, American soprano and actress (died 2010)
- 1929 – Abdi İpekçi, Turkish journalist and activist (died 1979)
- 1930 – Milt Bolling, American baseball player and scout (died 2013)
- 1930 – Jacques Parizeau, Canadian economist and politician, 26th Premier of Quebec (died 2015)
- 1931 – Chuck Essegian, American baseball player and lawyer
- 1931 – James Freeman Gilbert, American geophysicist and academic (died 2014)
- 1931 – Paula Kent Meehan, American businesswoman, co-founded Redken (died 2014)
- 1931 – Mário Zagallo, Brazilian footballer and coach (died 2024)
- 1932 – Tam Dalyell, Scottish academic and politician (died 2017)
- 1932 – John Gomery, Canadian lawyer and jurist (died 2021)
- 1933 – Tetsuko Kuroyanagi, Japanese actress, talk show host and author
- 1935 – Beverlee McKinsey, American actress (died 2008)
- 1936 – Julián Javier, Dominican-American baseball player
- 1936 – Patrick Tse, Chinese-Hong Kong actor, director, producer and screenwriter (died 2026)
- 1938 – Leonid Kuchma, Ukrainian engineer and politician, 2nd President of Ukraine
- 1938 – Rod Laver, Australian tennis player and coach
- 1938 – Otto Rehhagel, German footballer, coach, and manager
- 1939 – Hércules Brito Ruas, Brazilian footballer (died 2026)
- 1939 – Vincent Hanna, Northern Irish journalist (died 1997)
- 1939 – The Mighty Hannibal, American singer-songwriter and producer (died 2014)
- 1939 – Billy Henderson, American singer (died 2007)
- 1939 – Bulle Ogier, French actress and screenwriter
- 1939 – Romano Prodi, Italian academic and politician, 52nd Prime Minister of Italy
- 1939 – Butch Warren, American bassist (died 2013)
- 1940 – Linda Keen, American mathematician and academic
- 1942 – Jack DeJohnette, American Jazz drummer
- 1942 – David Steinberg, Canadian actor, director, producer, and screenwriter
- 1943 – Ken Norton, American boxer and actor (died 2013)
- 1944 – George Armstrong, English footballer (died 2000)
- 1944 – Patrick Depailler, French racing driver (died 1980)
- 1944 – Sam Elliott, American actor and producer
- 1944 – Patricia McKissack, American soldier, engineer, and author (died 2017)
- 1945 – Barbara Delinsky, American author
- 1945 – Aleksandr Gorelik, Russian figure skater and sportscaster (died 2012)
- 1945 – Posy Simmonds, English author and illustrator
- 1946 – Rinus Gerritsen, Dutch rock bass player
- 1947 – Roy Hodgson, English footballer and manager
- 1947 – Barbara Mason, American R&B/soul singer-songwriter
- 1947 – John Varley, American author
- 1948 – Bill Campbell, American baseball player and coach (died 2023)
- 1949 – Jonathan Kellerman, American psychologist and author
- 1949 – Ted Simmons, American baseball player and coach
- 1950 – Chris Haney, co-creator of the popular board game, Trivial Pursuit
- 1951 – James Naughtie, Scottish journalist and radio host
- 1951 – Steve Swisher, American baseball player and manager
- 1952 – Prateep Ungsongtham Hata, Thai activist and politician
- 1953 – Kay Stenshjemmet, Norwegian speed skater
- 1953 – Jean Tirole, French economist and academic, Nobel Prize laureate
- 1954 – Ray Jennings, South African cricketer and coach
- 1954 – Pete Thomas, English drummer
- 1955 – John E. Sweeney, American lawyer and politician
- 1956 – Gordon Singleton, Canadian Olympic cyclist (died 2024)
- 1957 – Melanie Griffith, American actress and producer
- 1958 – Amanda Bearse, American actress, comedian and director
- 1958 – Calie Pistorius, South African engineer and academic
- 1959 – Kurtis Blow, American rapper, producer, and actor
- 1959 – Michael Kors, American fashion designer
- 1961 – Brad Gilbert, American tennis player and sportscaster
- 1961 – John Key, New Zealand businessman and politician, 38th Prime Minister of New Zealand
- 1962 – Louis Lipps, American football player and radio host
- 1962 – Kevin Mack, American football player
- 1962 – John "Hot Rod" Williams, American basketball player (died 2015)
- 1963 – Whitney Houston, American singer-songwriter, producer, and actress (died 2012)
- 1963 – Jay Leggett, American actor, director, producer, and screenwriter (died 2013)
- 1963 – Barton Lynch, Australian surfer
- 1964 – Brett Hull, Canadian-American ice hockey player and manager
- 1964 – Hoda Kotb, American journalist and television personality
- 1965 – Nitin Chandrakant Desai, Indian art director, production designer, and film and television producer (died 2023)
- 1966 – Vinny Del Negro, American basketball player and coach
- 1966 – Linn Ullmann, Norwegian journalist and author
- 1967 – Deion Sanders, American football and baseball player and coach
- 1968 – Gillian Anderson, American-British actress, activist and writer
- 1968 – Eric Bana, Australian actor, comedian, producer, and screenwriter
- 1968 – Sam Fogarino, American drummer
- 1968 – McG, American director and producer
- 1969 – Troy Percival, American baseball player and coach
- 1970 – Rod Brind'Amour, Canadian ice hockey player and coach
- 1970 – Chris Cuomo, American lawyer and journalist
- 1970 – Thomas Lennon, American actor and comedian
- 1972 – Ryan Bollman, American actor
- 1972 – Juanes, Colombian singer and songwriter
- 1973 – Filippo Inzaghi, Italian footballer and manager
- 1973 – Kevin McKidd, Scottish actor and director
- 1973 – Gene Luen Yang, American author and illustrator
- 1974 – Derek Fisher, American basketball player and coach
- 1974 – Stephen Fung, Hong Kong actor, singer, director, and screenwriter
- 1974 – Lesley McKenna, Scottish snowboarder
- 1974 – Matt Morris, American baseball player
- 1974 – Kirill Reznik, American lawyer and politician
- 1974 – Raphaël Poirée, French biathlete
- 1975 – Mahesh Babu, Indian actor and producer
- 1975 – Valentin Kovalenko, Uzbek football referee
- 1975 – Mike Lamb, American baseball player
- 1975 – Robbie Middleby, Australian soccer player
- 1976 – Rhona Mitra, English actress and singer
- 1976 – Audrey Tautou, French model and actress
- 1976 – Jessica Capshaw, American actress
- 1977 – Jason Frasor, American baseball player
- 1977 – Chamique Holdsclaw, American basketball player
- 1977 – Ravshan Irmatov, Uzbek football referee
- 1977 – Adewale Ogunleye, American football player
- 1977 – Ime Udoka, American basketball player and coach
- 1977 – Mikaël Silvestre, French footballer
- 1978 – Dorin Chirtoacă, Moldavian lawyer and politician, Mayor of Chișinău
- 1978 – Ana Serradilla, Mexican actress and producer
- 1978 – Wesley Sonck, Belgian footballer
- 1979 – Michael Kingma, Australian basketball player
- 1979 – Kliff Kingsbury, American football coach
- 1979 – Lisa Nandy, British politician
- 1979 – Tony Stewart, American football player
- 1981 – Jarvis Hayes, American basketball player
- 1981 – Li Jiawei, Singaporean table tennis player
- 1982 – Joel Anthony, American basketball player
- 1982 – Tyson Gay, American sprinter
- 1982 – Yekaterina Samutsevich, Russian singer and activist
- 1982 – Kanstantsin Sivtsov, Belarusian cyclist
- 1983 – Virginia Giuffre, American sex trafficking activist and founder of Speak Out, accused Prince Andrew of sexual assault (died 2025)
- 1983 – Dan Levy, Canadian actor and comedian
- 1983 – Hamilton Masakadza, Zimbabwean cricketer
- 1983 – Shane O'Brien, Canadian ice hockey player
- 1983 – Alicja Smietana, Polish-English violinist
- 1984 – Paul Gallagher, Scottish footballer
- 1985 – Luca Filippi, Italian racing driver
- 1985 – Filipe Luís, Brazilian footballer
- 1985 – Anna Kendrick, American actress and singer
- 1985 – Hayley Peirsol, American swimmer
- 1985 – Vivek Ramaswamy, American entrepreneur and politician
- 1985 – JaMarcus Russell, American football player
- 1985 – Chandler Williams, American football player (died 2013)
- 1986 – Michael Lerchl, German footballer
- 1986 – Daniel Preussner, German rugby player
- 1986 – Tyler Smith, American singer-songwriter and bass player
- 1987 – Marek Niit, Estonian sprinter
- 1988 – Anthony Castonzo, American football player
- 1988 – Willian, Brazilian footballer
- 1988 – Vasilios Koutsianikoulis, Greek footballer
- 1989 – Jason Heyward, American baseball player
- 1989 – Stefano Okaka, Italian footballer
- 1989 – Kento Ono, Japanese actor and model
- 1990 – İshak Doğan, Turkish footballer
- 1990 – Sarah McBride, American LGBT activist and US Representative
- 1990 – Stuart McInally, Scottish rugby player
- 1990 – Brice Roger, French skier
- 1990 – D'Arcy Short, Australian cricketer
- 1990 – Bill Skarsgård, Swedish actor
- 1991 – Alice Barlow, English actress
- 1991 – Alexa Bliss, American bodybuilder and wrestler
- 1991 – Hansika Motwani, Indian actress
- 1992 – Farahnaz Forotan, Afghan journalist
- 1993 – Jun.Q, South Korean singer and actor
- 1993 – Dipa Karmakar, Indian gymnast
- 1994 – Kelli Hubly, American soccer player
- 1994 – King Von, American rapper (died 2020)
- 1995 – Eli Apple, American football player
- 1995 – Justice Smith, American actor
- 1995 – Hwang Min-hyun, South Korean singer and actor
- 1996 – Sanya Lopez, Filipino actress and model
- 1999 – Deniss Vasiļjevs, Latvian figure skater
- 1999 – Mingi, South Korean rapper and songwriter
- 2000 – Aidan Hutchinson, American football player
- 2000 – Arlo Parks, British singer-songwriter
- 2003 – Kazuha, Japanese singer and dancer
- 2005 – Victoria Jiménez Kasintseva, Andorran tennis player

== Deaths ==
=== Pre-1600 ===
- 378 – Traianus, Roman general
- 378 – Valens, Roman emperor (born 328)
- 803 – Irene of Athens, Byzantine ruler (born 752)
- 833 – Al-Ma'mun, Iraqi caliph (born 786)
- 1048 – Pope Damasus II
- 1107 – Emperor Horikawa of Japan (born 1079)
- 1173 – Najm ad-Din Ayyub, Kurdish soldier and politician
- 1211 – William de Braose, 4th Lord of Bramber, exiled Anglo-Norman baron (born 1144/53)
- 1260 – Walter of Kirkham, Bishop of Durham
- 1296 – Hugh, Count of Brienne, French crusader
- 1341 – Eleanor of Anjou, queen consort of Sicily (born 1289)
- 1354 – Stephen, Duke of Slavonia, Hungarian prince (born 1332)
- 1420 – Pierre d'Ailly, French theologian and cardinal (born 1351)
- 1516 – Hieronymus Bosch, Early Netherlandish painter (born circa 1450)
- 1534 – Thomas Cajetan, Italian cardinal and philosopher (born 1470)
- 1580 – Metrophanes III of Constantinople (born 1520)

=== 1601–1900 ===
- 1601 – Michael the Brave, Romanian prince (born 1558)
- 1634 – William Noy, English lawyer and judge (born 1577)
- 1720 – Simon Ockley, English orientalist and academic (born 1678)
- 1744 – James Brydges, 1st Duke of Chandos, English academic and politician, Lord Lieutenant of Radnorshire (born 1673)
- 1816 – Johann August Apel, German jurist and author (born 1771)
- 1861 – Vincent Novello, English composer and publisher (born 1781)
- 1886 – Samuel Ferguson, Irish lawyer and poet (born 1810)

=== 1901–present ===
- 1910 – Huo Yuanjia, Chinese martial artist, co-founded the Chin Woo Athletic Association (born 1868)
- 1919 – Ruggero Leoncavallo, Italian composer and educator (born 1857)
- 1920 – Samuel Griffith, Welsh-Australian politician, 9th Premier of Queensland (born 1845)
- 1932 – John Charles Fields, Canadian mathematician, founder of the Fields Medal (born 1863)
- 1941 – Richard Goss, Executed Irish Republican (born 1915)
- 1942 – Edith Stein, German nun and saint (born 1891)
- 1943 – Chaïm Soutine, Belarusian-French painter and educator (born 1893)
- 1945 – Robert Hampton Gray, Canadian lieutenant and pilot, Victoria Cross recipient (born 1917)
- 1945 – Harry Hillman, American runner and coach (born 1881)
- 1946 – Bert Vogler, South African cricketer (born 1876)
- 1948 – Hugo Boss, German fashion designer, founded Hugo Boss (born 1885)
- 1949 – Edward Thorndike, American psychologist and academic (born 1874)
- 1957 – Carl Clauberg, German Nazi physician (born 1898)
- 1962 – Hermann Hesse, German-born Swiss poet, novelist, and painter, Nobel Prize laureate (born 1877)
- 1963 – Patrick Bouvier Kennedy, American son of John F. Kennedy (born 1963)
- 1967 – Joe Orton, English author and playwright (born 1933)
- 1969 – C. F. Powell, English physicist and academic, Nobel Prize laureate (born 1903)
- 1970 – Jimmy Steele (Irish republican), lifelong militant and editor (born 1907)
- 1972 – Sıddık Sami Onar, Turkish lawyer and academic (born 1897)
- 1974 – Bill Chase, American trumpet player and bandleader (born 1934)
- 1975 – Dmitri Shostakovich, Russian pianist and composer (born 1906)
- 1978 – James Gould Cozzens, American novelist and short story writer (born 1903)
- 1979 – Walter O'Malley, American businessman, owner of baseball's Dodgers (born 1903)
- 1979 – Raymond Washington, American gang leader, founded the Crips (born 1953)
- 1980 – Jacqueline Cochran, American pilot (born 1906)
- 1980 – Ruby Hurley, American civil rights activist (born 1909)
- 1981 – Max Hoffman, Austrian-born car importer and businessman (born 1904)
- 1985 – Clive Churchill, Australian rugby league player and coach (born 1927)
- 1986 – Eoin McNamee (Irish republican), Chief of Staff of the Irish Republican Army (born 1914)
- 1988 – M. Carl Holman, American author, educator, poet, and playwright (born 1919)
- 1988 – Giacinto Scelsi, Italian composer (born 1905)
- 1990 – Joe Mercer, English footballer and manager (born 1914)
- 1992 – Fereydoun Farrokhzad, Iranian singer and actor (born 1938)
- 1995 – Jerry Garcia, American singer-songwriter and guitarist (born 1942)
- 1996 – Frank Whittle, English soldier and engineer, invented the jet engine (born 1907)
- 1999 – Helen Rollason, English sports journalist and sportscaster (born 1956)
- 1999 – Fouad Serageddin, Egyptian journalist and politician (born 1910)
- 2000 – John Harsanyi, Hungarian-American economist and academic, Nobel Prize laureate (born 1920)
- 2000 – Nicholas Markowitz, American murder victim (born 1984)
- 2002 – Paul Samson, English guitarist (born 1953)
- 2003 – Jacques Deray, French director and screenwriter (born 1929)
- 2003 – Ray Harford, English footballer and manager (born 1945)
- 2003 – Gregory Hines, American actor, dancer, and choreographer (born 1946)
- 2003 – R. Sivagurunathan, Sri Lankan lawyer, journalist, and academic (born 1931)
- 2004 – Robert Lecourt, French lawyer and politician, Lord Chancellor of France (born 1908)
- 2004 – Tony Mottola, American guitarist and composer (born 1918)
- 2004 – David Raksin, American composer and educator (born 1912)
- 2005 – Judith Rossner, American author (born 1935)
- 2006 – Philip E. High, English author (born 1914)
- 2006 – James Van Allen, American physicist and academic (born 1914)
- 2007 – Joe O'Donnell, American photographer and journalist (born 1922)
- 2008 – Bernie Mac, American comedian, actor, screenwriter, and producer (born 1957)
- 2008 – Mahmoud Darwish, Palestinian author and poet (born 1941)
- 2010 – Calvin "Fuzz" Jones, American singer and bass player (born 1926)
- 2010 – Ted Stevens, American soldier, lawyer, and politician (born 1923)
- 2012 – Carl Davis, American record producer (born 1934)
- 2012 – Gene F. Franklin, American engineer, theorist, and academic (born 1927)
- 2012 – Al Freeman, Jr., American actor, director, and educator (born 1934)
- 2012 – David Rakoff, Canadian-American actor and journalist (born 1964)
- 2012 – Carmen Belen Richardson, Puerto Rican-American actress (born 1930)
- 2012 – Mel Stuart, American director and producer (born 1928)
- 2013 – Harry Elliott, American baseball player and coach (born 1923)
- 2013 – Eduardo Falú, Argentinian guitarist and composer (born 1923)
- 2013 – William Lynch, Jr., American lawyer and politician (born 1947)
- 2014 – J. F. Ade Ajayi, Nigerian historian and academic (born 1929)
- 2014 – Andriy Bal, Ukrainian footballer and coach (born 1958)
- 2014 – Arthur G. Cohen, American businessman and philanthropist, co-founded Arlen Realty and Development Corporation (born 1930)
- 2014 – Ed Nelson, American actor (born 1928)
- 2015 – Frank Gifford, American football player, sportscaster, and actor (born 1930)
- 2015 – John Henry Holland, American computer scientist and academic (born 1929)
- 2015 – Walter Nahún López, Honduran footballer (born 1977)
- 2015 – David Nobbs, English author and screenwriter (born 1935)
- 2015 – Kayyar Kinhanna Rai, Indian journalist, author, and poet (born 1915)
- 2015 – Fikret Otyam, Turkish painter and journalist (born 1926)
- 2016 – Gerald Grosvenor, 6th Duke of Westminster, third-richest British citizen (born 1951)
- 2021 – Pat Hitchcock, English actress and producer (born 1928)
- 2021 – Killer Kau, South African rapper, dancer and record producer (born 1998)
- 2021 – Zairaini Sarbini, Malaysian voice actress (born 1972)
- 2023 – Robbie Robertson, Canadian singer-songwriter, guitarist, producer, and actor (born 1943)
- 2024 – Susan Wojcicki, Polish-American technology executive (born 1968)

== Holidays and observances ==
- Battle of Gangut Day (Russia)
- Christian feast day:
  - Candida Maria of Jesus
  - Edith Stein (St Teresa Benedicta of the Cross)
  - Firmus and Rusticus
  - Blessed Florentino Asensio Barroso
  - Herman of Alaska (Russian Orthodox Church and related congregations; Episcopal Church (USA))
  - Mary Sumner (Church of England)
  - Nath Í of Achonry
  - Romanus Ostiarius
  - Secundian, Marcellian and Verian
  - August 9 (Eastern Orthodox liturgics)
- International Day of the World's Indigenous Peoples (United Nations)
- Meyboom (Brussels and Leuven, Belgium)
- National Day, celebrates the independence of Singapore from Malaysia in 1965.
- National Peacekeepers' Day, celebrated on Sunday closest to the day (Canada)
- National Women's Day (South Africa)
- Day of the Finnish art, also birthday of Tove Jansson (Finland)
