= Alyy Patel =

South Asian-Canadian LGBTQ+ activist

Sonali (Alyy) Patel
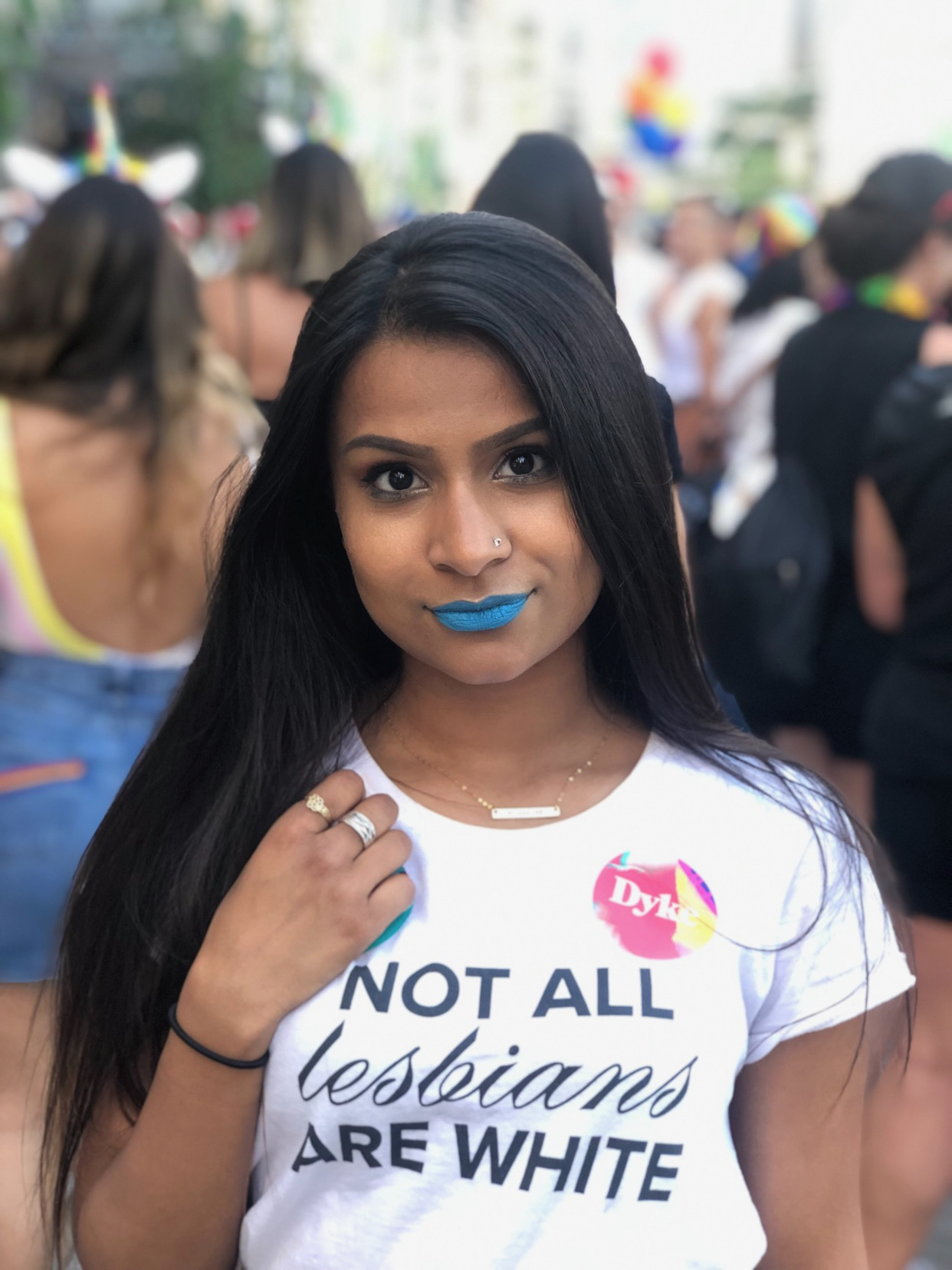
- Patel at Pride Toronto's 2019 Parade
- Born: Sonali Patel; 1996 (age 29–30); Toronto, Ontario, Canada
- Other name: Alyy Patel
- Education: University of Toronto (BA); University of Ottawa (MA); University of British Columbia (PhD)
- Occupations: Canadian LGBTQ+ activist; sociologist; author; public speaker
- Known for: South Asian-Canadian LGBTQ+ activism
- Website: alyypatel.com

Sonali Patel, also known as Alyy Patel, is a Canadian LGBTQ+ activist, who focuses on experiences of Queer South Asian women in Canada.

== Early and personal life ==
Patel grew up in Halton Region, Ontario. She is of Indo-African Gujarati descent.

== Career ==
=== Research on queer South Asian women ===
Patel's research initially examined the forms of racial discrimination against queer South Asian women in North American LGBTQ+ communities. This was followed by research on the institutional mechanisms that reinforce the exclusion of queer South Asian women in LGBTQ+ communities. Patel's later research focuses on second-generation queer South Asian women's experiences in the sexual minority closet. She publishes her research under her legal name, Sonali Patel. She is a sociologist by academic training.

=== LGBTQ+ activism ===
Patel was a part of the Youth Action Committee that organized Halton Pride 2016. In 2017, Patel was co-president of Woodsworth College's Sexual & Gender Diversity Office, Woodsworth Inclusive (WiNC).

In 2019, Patel founded the Queer South Asian Women's Network in Canada.

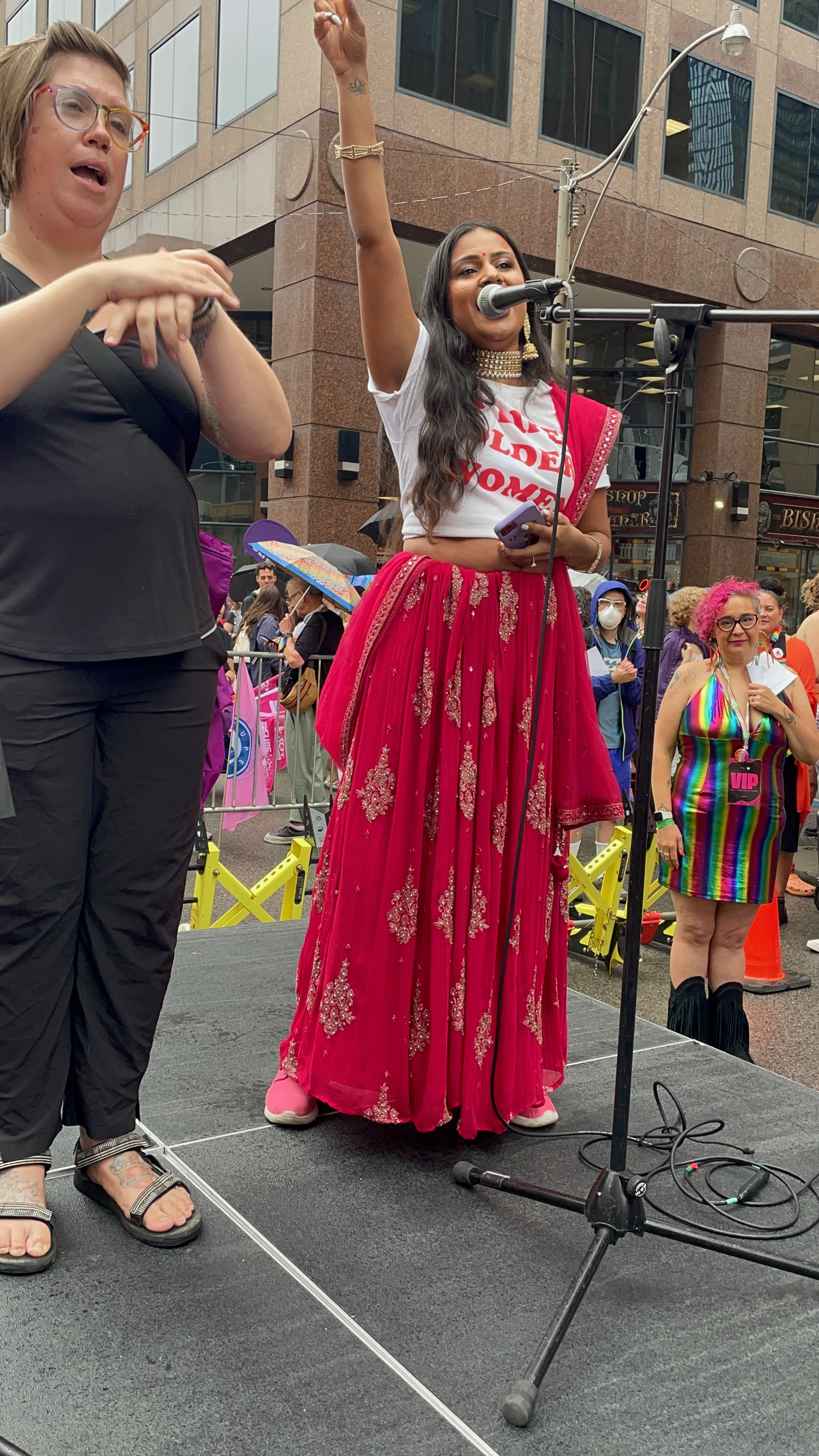
Ally Patel at the 2024 Dyke March

=== Influence ===
As an LGBTQ+ South Asian activist, Patel appeared in 2023 on Amazon Prime Video's Pride Campaign in downtown Toronto's Sankofa Square.

In 2020 and 2024, Patel was a speaker at Pride Toronto's Dyke March. In 2022, Patel was a speaker at the Ontario Government's Pride Flag Raising Ceremony.

== Select works ==
- Patel, S. (2019). "Brown girls can’t be gay": Racism experienced by queer South Asian women in the Toronto LGBTQ community.
- Patel, S. (2021). "Not All Lesbians are White: The Struggles of a Queer South Asian Woman" in Essays on Queer Joy (Ed. Samantha Mann).
- Patel, S. (2022). Don't Tell My Parents: Queer Diasporic Truths
- Patel, S. (2024). Theorizing A Denial Reaction to Coming Out: Revising Goffman's Stigma through a Sexual Identity Process Model
