= Alfred David Benjamin =

Australian-born businessman and philanthropist

- Born: August 9, 1848; Australia
- Died: January 8, 1900 (aged 51)
- Occupations: Businessman and philanthropist

Alfred David Benjamin (August 9, 1848 – January 8, 1900) was an Australian-born businessman and philanthropist.

Benjamin immigrated to Canada in 1873 and entered into the wholesale hardware business with his father's financial backing. He became a partner in M. and L. Samuel and Company and, after the death of Lewis Samuel in 1887, he became the leader of the company.

His success in a variety of business ventures allowed him to pursue various philanthropic goals. His most important contribution was to the Jewish community in Toronto, Ontario, where he was the leader of the Holy Blossom Temple congregation and a major contributor to the new synagogue in 1897.

== See also ==
- Lists of Australians
- List of people from Toronto
- List of philanthropists
