= Holly Farrell =

Canadian painter (born 1961)

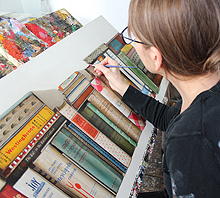
- Born: Holly Susan Farrell; December 6, 1961 (age 64); North Bay, Ontario, Canada
- Education: Self-taught
- Known for: Painter
- Website: www.hollyfarrell.com

Holly Farrell (born 1961) is a Canadian painter.

Nostalgia drives her subject matter, still life being her main focus. Farrell considers her still life paintings to be simple meditations on people and places she has known – there is a sense of the portrait in everything that she paints. Farrell's subjects are the common, everyday tools of day-to-day existence – things that many people are able to project their own experiences onto.

Farrell's work has been exhibited in Canada, the U.S., England, and Japan. Her paintings are in corporate and private collections throughout North America, Europe, Australia and Japan including: BMO, Canada; William Louis-Dreyfus Family Collection (Gérard Louis-Dreyfus), U.S.A., and Sony Music,

Farrell says:

"Homely is how I would describe most of my subjects. It’s how I feel when I look at my paintings, whether I am connecting to something, someone, or some time. A clear line is drawn to people who are closest to me. My cookbook series is an homage to my mother…memories of her baking pies, roasting roasts – memories of her standing behind the counter of our family diner, lipstick on cigarettes and coffee cups. Chairs, bowls, clocks…other domestic tools…functional things that now hold special meaning, allowing us to reach back for a moment and maybe experience a bit of the past." - Holly Farrell, 2017

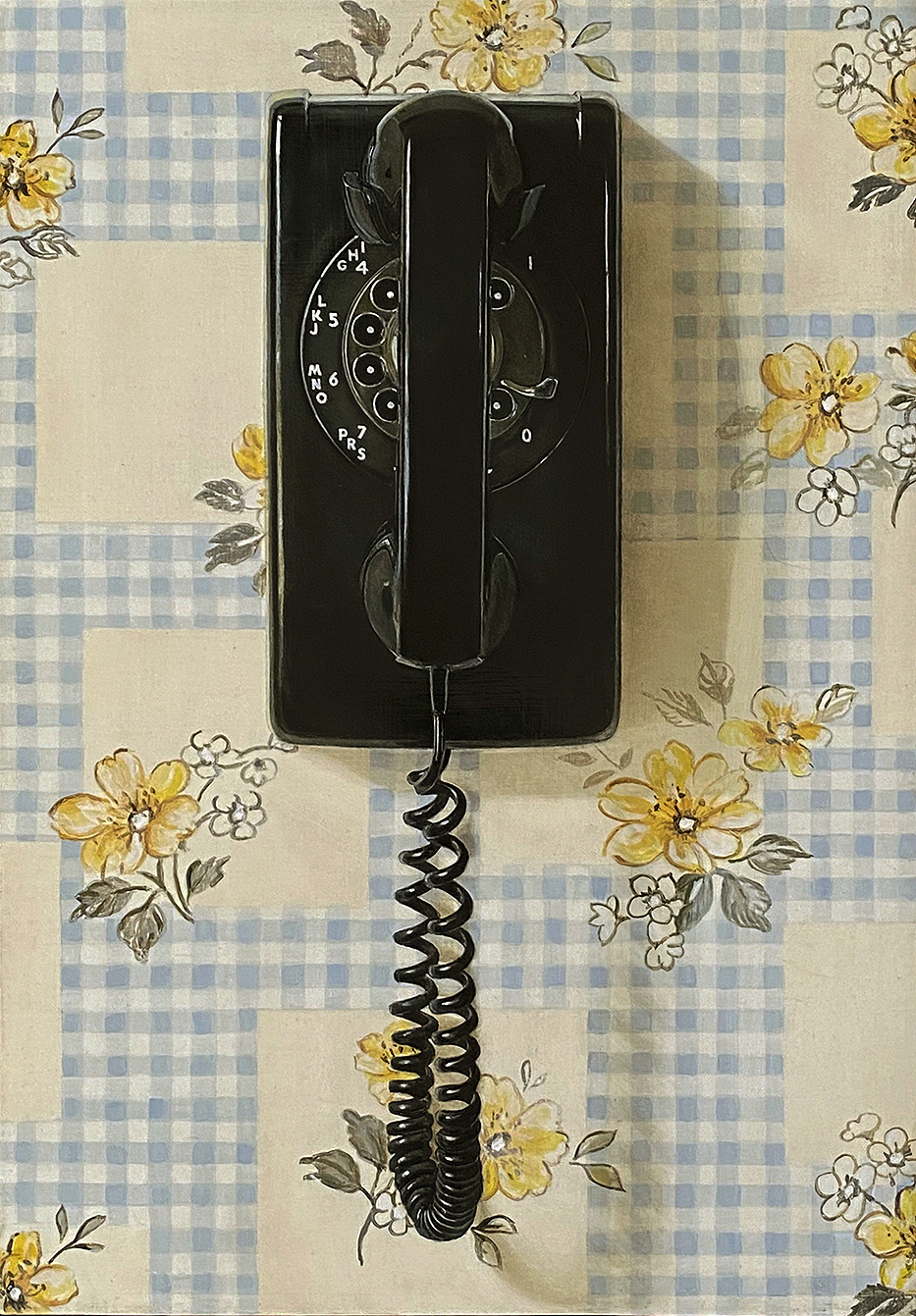
Phone, acrylic & oil on board, 20 x 14 inches. Used with permission from Holly Farrell.

== Painting ==
Having no art training beyond high school, Farrell began painting at 30, something she did to counter the stress of her daytime work. Considered self-taught, she exhibited her first paintings in the Folk Art category at the Toronto Outdoor Art Exhibition in 1992. Between 1992 and 2000 Farrell focused on honing her drawing and painting skills, while trying to build a following in Toronto. By 2005 Farrell had gained attention in such publications as Toronto Life, The Toronto Star, and the Globe And Mail. The Star's Peter Goddard said about Farrell's 2003 show:

"Yet her works share with his (Morandi's) sense of discovery, as if you've never seen what you're seeing as quite as memorable as they now seem. It's as if the artists added something unseen to their mass. Gravity's pull on them feels much greater than it should be. Like Morandi's, Farrell's work denies any critical attempt to mine them for symbolic content. If they're about childhood, no analysts allowed. Same too, with the objects she uses - or the objects she comes upon. Her paintings act as spies, seemingly catching their subject unprepared.

- Peter Goddard, 2003.

Making good use of the internet Farrell expanded her reach to connect with galleries and clients in the U.S. She participated in Folk Fest Art Fair in Atlanta Georgia where she connected with Karen Light, owner of Garde Rail Gallery. Light exhibited Farrell's work in shows at Garde Rail Gallery in Seattle, garnering reviews from the Seattle Post Intelligencer as well as Seattle Weekly. Light was also instrumental in introducing Farrell's paintings to the New York Outsider Art Fair.

Farrell is represented by Mira Godard Gallery in Toronto where her work is exhibited alongside such notable Canadian artists as Christopher Pratt, Alex Colville, David Milne, Mary Pratt, and Tom Forrestall, Takao Tanabe, and Joe Fafard.

During the Covid lockdown Farrell decided to focus on working towards a 2021 solo exhibition at Mira Godard Gallery that would celebrate the classic albums that, for her, defined the 70s - iconic albums that helped to shape an era, define a generation. And she would paint them four times the size of her original vintage vinyl albums. She also decided to seek approvals for each record from people as close to the 'creators' as possible. Farrell worked for two and a half years contacting management, labels, musicians, artists...and only created paintings that had the approvals she sought. Much of this research was accomplished during the Covid lockdown.

"All of my work is tethered to memory, how it shapes us, how things common to us all, like music, continue to hold sway over us. I like that a song can pull out long forgotten ’things’ - memories that are attached to feelings, faces, places. Typically I paint Still Life, but it seemed a natural progression to go through my vintage vinyl collection and want to do paintings of the records I grew up with. I wanted to paint in the physical history of these records - the sleeves, the wear, the patina, the softened corners - the impression of the vinyl within pushing out onto the cover. All evidence of long lives these past 50 or so odd years. I suppose the lives of these records from my collection, run parallel to mine - similarly I am a bit worn, a few wrinkles - a reflection of where I’ve been, who I am." Holly Farrell, 2021

Farrell received 32 approvals in all. Pink Floyd, Bob Dylan, Elton John, Bruce Springsteen, Carole King, David Bowie, The Rolling Stones, Neil Young...were just a few of the approvals for The Album Project paintings. The exhibition opened in September 2021, just after the Covid lockdown ended.

Holly Farrell working on paintings for The Album Project in her Toronto studio.

In the US, Farrell is represented by Clark Gallery, one of New England's leading art galleries. She has been represented by Clark since her first solo exhibition there in 2007.
