= Peter Donato =

Canadian marathon runner

Peter Donato is a marathon runner from Toronto, Canada. Running in the costume of Jefferson, the mascot dog of MyNextRace.com, he obtained the record for the fastest marathon run by a male wearing a mascot costume when finished the Scotiabank Toronto Waterfront Marathon in 4 hours 16 minutes 43 seconds on September 26, 2010. This record was covered by the CBC, Toronto Star and Runners Web.

== Career ==
He also held the Guinness World Record for half-marathon run by a male in a mascot costume. He achieved this during the Publix Supermarkets Gasparilla Distance Classic in Tampa, FL, U.S.A. on February 27, 2011. Running in the Jefferson costume, he completed the Half-Marathon in 1hr 59min 14sec. This new record was covered by Irun Magazine in Canada and the Tampa Times. This half-marathon record was then broken by the Brand Manager of MyNextRace.com, David Hiddleston, on October 13, 2011, at the same race, in 1 hour, 46 minutes, 27 seconds.

The costume weighs 25 pounds. MyNextRace.com is a website maintained by All Sports Marketing Inc., a company founded by Donato which specializes in marketing and management of sporting events. Donato was also quoted in the Globe and Mail for his efforts to revive MyNextRace.com in 2012. One of the biggest fans of MyNextRace.com and a personal friend and sponsored athlete, Danny Kassap died due to heart problems discovered after pulling out of the Sporting Life 10k race.

MyNextRace.com created the first ever Midnight Run in Canada on December 31 in Liberty Village, Toronto. Peter Donato was quoted as a "local legend" in the Toronto Star. Good Times Running took over the event and added the largest halloween fitness experience called Monster Dash Toronto to the lineup. Local media outlets have covered this popular event, including the Simcoe News.

In 2020, after the global COVID-19 pandemic shut down the events industry, Mr. Donato started a fundraiser for health care workers which has raised over $30,000 to date. The Isolation Run attracted participants from across Canada, and was featured in the news when Donato raised money himself and cycled 273 kilometres throughout the Niagara region as a personal challenge.
