= F. A. Sampson =

Canadian Air Force officer (1905–1983)

Group Captain Franklin Augustus Sampson OC OBE (July 7, 1905 – May 5, 1983), often known as Sammie Sampson, was a Royal Canadian Air Force officer and military attaché. He was born in Royal Flat, Jamaica. Stationed in England in 1939, he was instrumental in quashing a general strike by 1,500 Canadian enlisted personnel. During World War II he was involved in the training of British and Commonwealth fighter pilots. He was one of only three Canadian nationals assigned to Supreme Headquarters Allied Expeditionary Force under General Dwight D. Eisenhower. He was an expert on prisoners of war and lobbied successfully for the military to be involved in civilian repatriation. After the war he became a military attaché in Argentina (1948) and Paris (1951). During his career he was awarded the Legion of Merit (United States), Croix de Guerre with Silver Star (France) and the Order of the British Empire. He died in 1983 in Brockville, Canada.

== Military career ==
During World War II, Sampson was one of only three Canadian military personnel stationed at Supreme Headquarters Allied Expeditionary Force (SHAEF) under General Dwight D. Eisenhower, the Supreme Allied Commander. He was selected due to his expertise regarding the repatriation of military prisoners of war. Notable later stations included Argentina and Paris following World War II. Sampson was head of air force personnel in London leading up to the Battle of Britain in 1939 - 1940. In February 1939, following the Munich Agreement and during preparations to defend England against an imminent German air campaign, which commenced later that year, Sampson was instrumental in quashing a general strike by 1,500 Canadian enlisted personnel stationed at RAF Odiham Air Base, Down Ampney, Gloucestershire, England. With threat of war on the horizon, the enlisted personnel were seeking immediate repatriation to Canada. The base was a critical air logistics hub for British defensive operations. Acting on direct orders from Canadian Prime Minister Mackenzie King to enforce Canada's military commitments in defense of England in the lead up to World War II, Sampson confronted strike leaders on the steps of Canada House in London, 8 February 1939 declaring "It will be considered mutiny if you men are out after February 11, 1939".

During the war, Sampson was assigned to RAF No. 27 to train British and Commonwealth fighter pilots, and later assigned to station command at Allerton Park (Allerton Castle) upon the establishment of No. 6 Group RCAF (No. 6 Group RCAF). At the war's end the RCAF had 11 bomber stations in England; seven of these were operational stations, controlled by No. 6 Group responsible for over 40,000 sorties, making it one of the most productive bomber units of the entire war. An expert on prisoners of war, Sampson was one of only three Canadian nationals assigned to Supreme Headquarters Allied Expeditionary Force (SHAEF) upon preparations for Project Overlord: D-Day, with direct responsibility for repatriating first military, then later civilian POWs. During this period, Sampson lobbied General Eisenhower extensively, and ultimately, successfully, to extend SHAEF command authority to include civilian repatriation, thereby making the liberation of concentration camps a military responsibility. Sampson was awarded the Legion of Merit by Dwight D. Eisenhower at Camp Griffis on 12 December 1944 for his efforts. The medal is the highest military honor that can be awarded to a foreign national by the U.S. government. It is the only citation to be awarded as a neck order, other than the Congressional Medal of Honor.

Many of the details regarding Sampson's activities during and after World War II remain sealed under Canada's Official Secrets Act and Security of Information Act. Sampson pursued his liberation related responsibilities for the rest of his military career as commanding military attaché in Argentina (1948) and Paris (1951), until his retirement in 1955. On 29 January 1947 Sampson was presented with Order of the British Empire for outstanding service as Commanding Officer of the Base Station in No.61 (RCAF) Base and, later, the Base Station at No.64 (RCAF) Base, "as largely responsible for the very enviable record shown by both of these stations under his command". On 12 September 1947, Sampson was awarded Croix de Guerre with Silver Star (France) for gallantry in action against an enemy.
