= Faith Amour =

- Born: Toronto, Canada
- Genres: jazz, world
- Occupations: singer, elementary school music teacher
- Years active: 2010 –
- Website: faithamourjazz.com

Faith Amour is a jazz artist known for performing in multiple languages.

== Career ==
Faith Amour grew up singing in church choirs in the suburbs of Toronto. She studied piano, organ, and composition. Her debut album Bright Eyes, recorded in multiple languages, received recognition at the New Mexico Music Awards, where it won awards for Best Jazz CD and Best Jazz Vocal for the original song "Ou es-tu?".

Amour has performed across North America, Europe, and South America. She opened for Greg Abate, performed with soprano Kathleen Battle as a member of the Nathaniel Dett Chorale, and shared the stage with renowned musicians such as Mario Canonge, Rich Brown, Dave Restivo, and Robi Botos. Faith Amour shared the stage with Ranee Lee and Joe Sealy during the event "First Ladies of Jazz."

Faith paid tribute to Ella Fitzgerald's 100th birthday with concerts across Canada and the United States. She has participated in various festivals, including the TD Niagara Jazz Festival series and the AWA Festival. She performed at Blue Note Beijing and Shanghai.

Performing regularly for the consular events for Guyana in Toronto.

== Musical style ==
Faith Amour is known for her interpretations of jazz standards in tribute to jazz divas such as Ella Fitzgerald, Nina Simone, and Anita O’Day. Her Classic Jazz performances celebrate traditional jazz, while her Kaleidoscope series explores contemporary jazz infused with global music influences, in the spirit of artists like Kurt Elling, Somi, and Gretchen Parlato.

In 2017, she held a series of concerts honoring the 100th anniversary of Ella Fitzgerald’s birth across Canada and the United States.

== Awards ==
- Best Vocal Performance, for "Ou es-tu?", 2013 New Mexico Music Awards
- Best Jazz CD for “Bright Eyes” album, 2014 New Mexico Music Awards
