= Rachel Parent =

Canadian activist

- Born: 1999 (age 26–27)
- Occupations: Student, activist Founder of Kids Right To Know
- Years active: 2010–present
- Website: KidsRightToKnow.com

Rachel Parent (born 1999) is a Toronto-based activist for issues related to genetically modified organisms (GMOs) in foods, and especially government regulation in regard to food labeling. She is the founder of the non-profit Kids Right To Know and the associated website.

== Activism ==
Parent's interest in genetically modified foods began when she was 11 years old. (Note: Although Parent herself in interview stated she was 11 at the time, at least one other sourced reported age 12.) She was required to research material for a school project and chose the subject of GMOs, when she found it troubling that Canada did not require food manufacturers to put labels on genetically modified foods.

=== The Lang and O'Leary Exchange ===
On the May 27, 2013 episode of the CBC television program The Lang and O'Leary Exchange, Kevin O'Leary criticized protestors belonging to the March Against Monsanto movement by saying, "Monsanto should be held up as a hero because they've developed technologies that help underdeveloped countries increase productivity by 5 and 10 times. You're an ignorant and stupid person if you say what Monsanto does is bad for human beings."

After the program aired, Parent challenged O'Leary to a debate, saying, "I want to respond to Mr. Kevin O'Leary's idiotic statement about 'stupid' people who protest against Monsanto. I challenge you, Mr. O'Leary, to have me on your show next week, and if you promise not to use the word 'stupid,' then I won't use the word fascist."

On July 31, Parent appeared for a ten-minute interview on the Lang and O'Leary Exchange to debate her position that GMO labeling should be mandatory and that GMOs should be independently tested. O'Leary asked Parent if she thought she was a lobbyist for the anti-GMO movement. O'Leary, then asked if Parents' points, resorted to asking her if she was a "shill" for groups adding, "You're young, you're articulate, you're getting lots of media, and I'm happy for you on that. But I'm trying to figure out whether you really deep down believe this."

=== Media appearances ===
Parent has given many radio, television and magazine interviews. She also gave a number of presentations at the 14th annual Planet In Focus Film Festival Green Living Show, Total Health Show, TedX Toronto, Australia UpLift Festival and the Toronto Veg Fest Parent is a participant in the United Nations Youth Leaders Educational Program, and has been a key speaker events including the March Against Monsanto, WE Day, and the Vancouver Women's Health Show.

Parent is a contributing author to the Huffington Post. She founded and runs the non-profit Kids Right To Know and associated website.

=== Meetings with government officials ===
On November 5, 2014, Parent met with the then Canadian Health Minister, Rona Ambrose, to discuss labeling of GMO food. The 45-minute meeting was the result of Global News asking Ambrose if she would agree to meet with Parent.

On June 30, 2016, Parent met with Canada's current Minister of Health, Jane Philpott, to discuss GMOs and labeling. Dr. Philpott was presented with a list of international organizations supporting GMO labeling that included the Ontario Public Health Association, Canadian Association of Physicians for the Environment, American Nurses Association and the British Medical Association. Regardless of this Dr Philpott reiterated that there was currently no scientific evidence that proved GMOs were unhealthy for Canadians and that she would not be moving toward mandatory labelling and assured foods in Canada, genetically engineered or otherwise, were highly regulated.

== Recognition ==
Parent was named as the Rob Stewart Youth Eco-Hero in 2018 by Planet in Focus, an environmental film festival based in Toronto. She was also named one of the most inspiring women of 2017 by Post City Magazines. In 2016 the Pacific Standard named Parent as one of the 30 top thinkers under 30. In 2014, Parent was named one of Toronto's Top 20 under-20s by Post City Toronto magazine.

== See also ==
- Greta Thunberg
