= Homelessness in the United States =

The official homeless population counts by state, 2019

As COVID-era protection programs expired and a cost-of-living crisis hit the country, homelessness numbers rose, surpassing 2007 Great Recession levels in 2023.

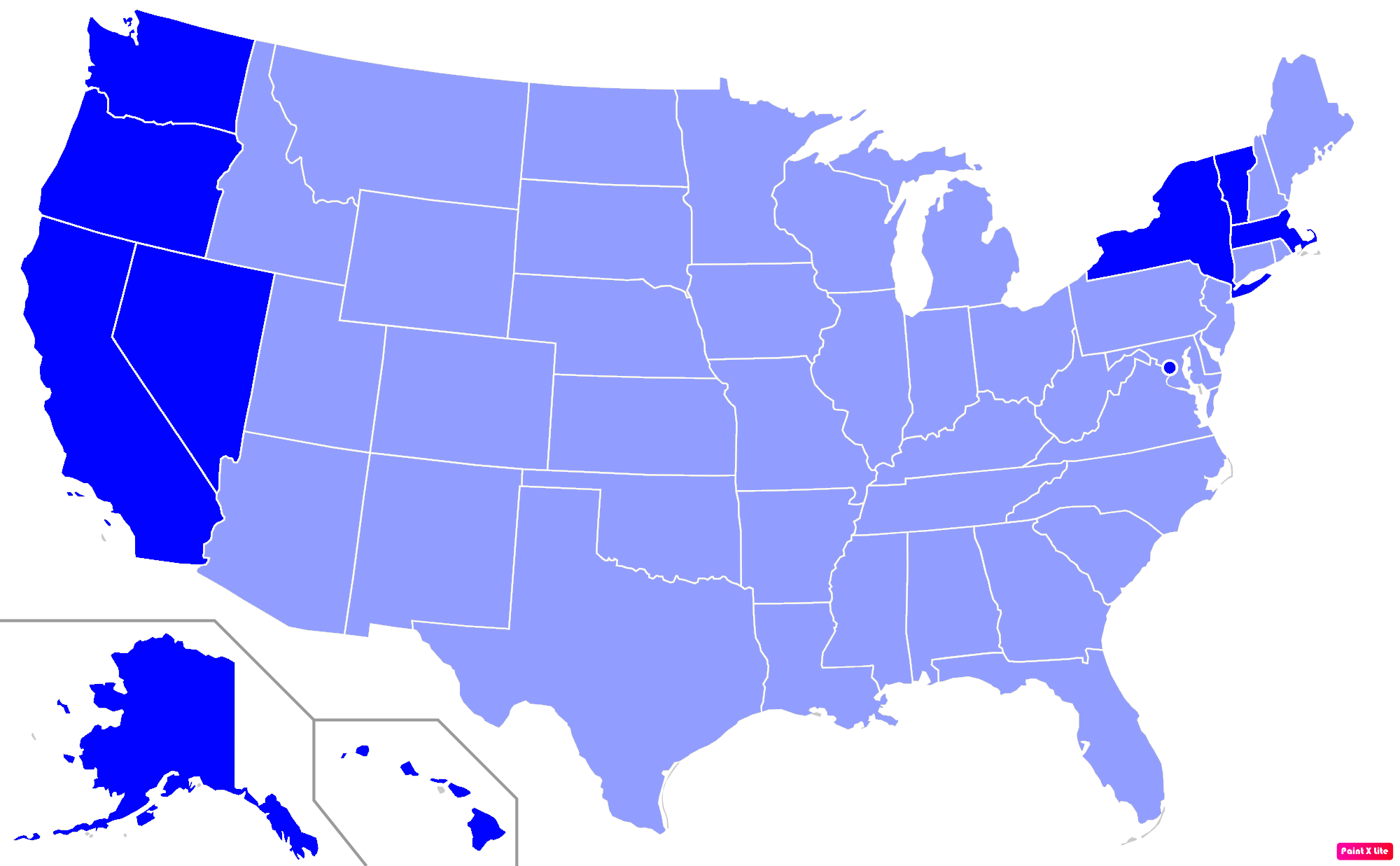
The statewide homelessness population rates as compared with the national U.S. homelessness rate (0.17% or 171 persons per 100,000) in 2019. Of the 9 states (Alaska, California, Hawaii, Massachusetts, Nevada, New York, Oregon, Vermont, and Washington) and the District of Columbia that have homelessness rates higher than the United States as a whole, only Vermont did not have median gross rents higher than the United States as a whole in the 2015–2019 American Community Survey 5-year estimates.

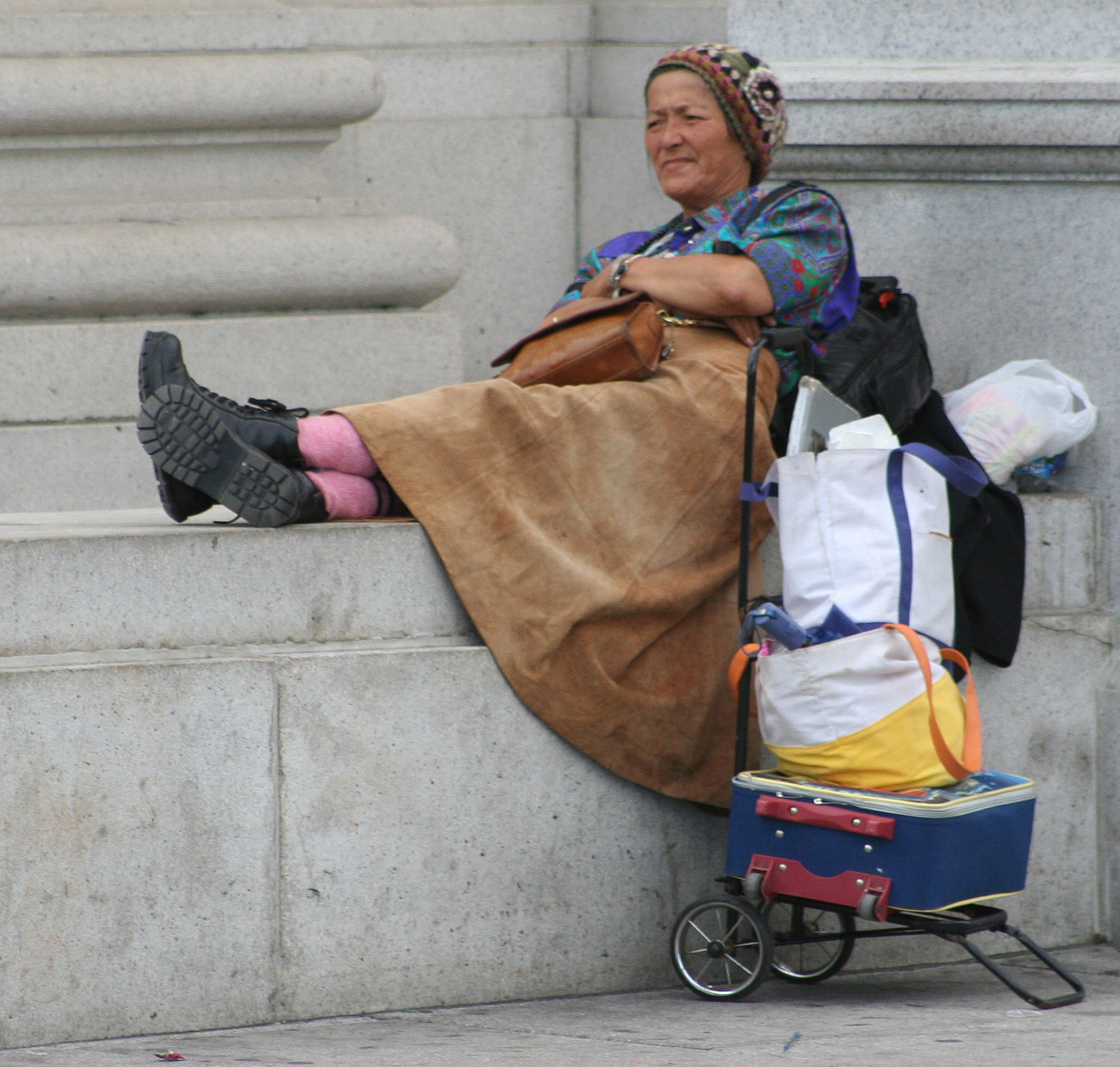
A homeless woman in Washington, D.C., 2006

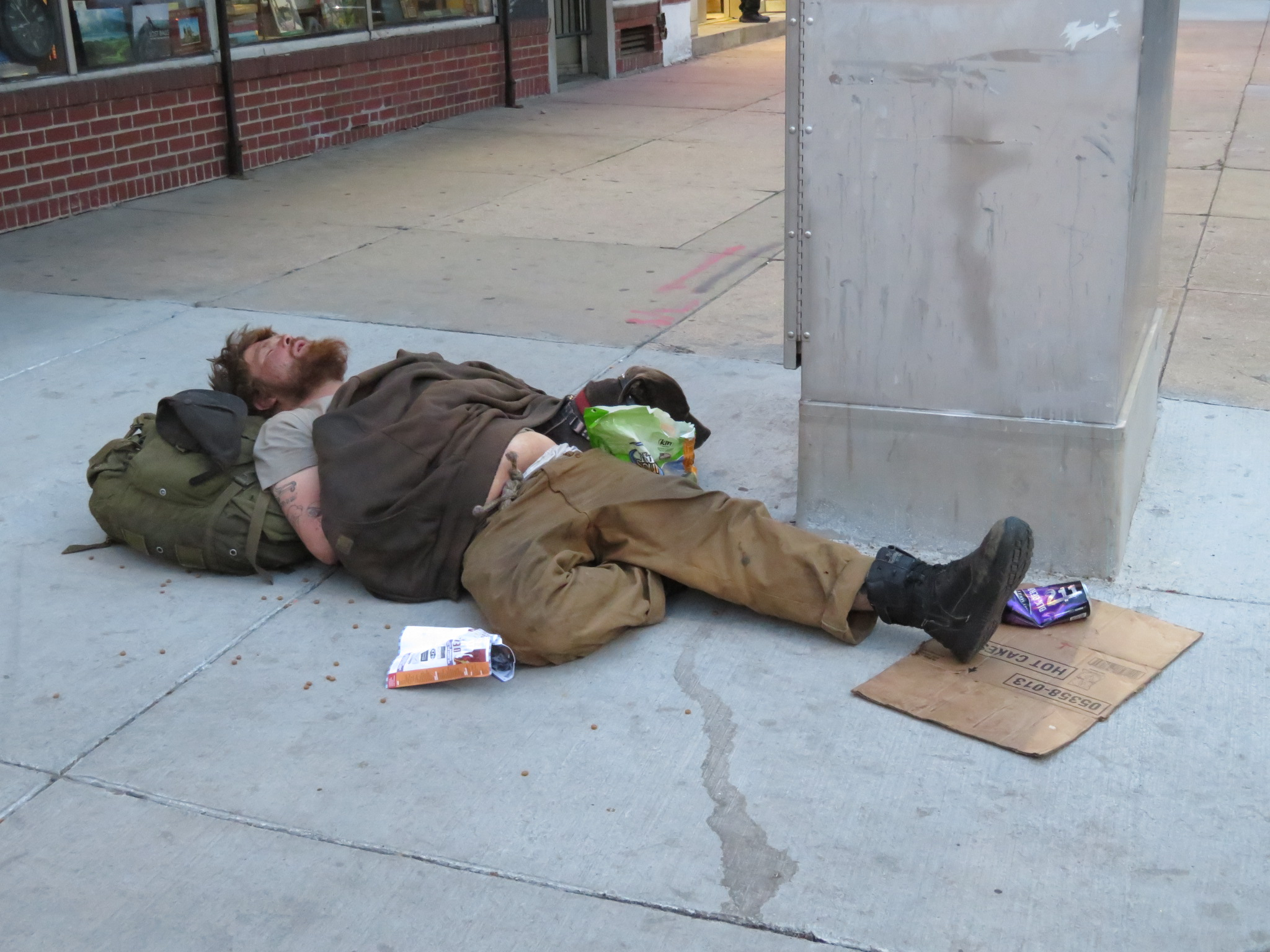
A homeless man sleeping across the street from the Colorado State Capitol Building in Denver, 2018

On a single night in January 2025, the U.S. Department of Housing and Urban Development estimated that 745,652 people were experiencing homelessness in the United States, including 266,320 in unsheltered locations, about 3% fewer overall than in 2024. Homelessness has increased in recent years, in large part due to an increasingly severe housing shortage and rising home prices in the United States. Most homeless people lived in California, New York, Florida, and Washington in 2022, according to the annual Homeless Assessment Report. The majority of homeless people in the United States have been homeless for less than one year; two surveys by YouGov in 2022 and 2023 found that just under 20 percent of Americans reported having ever been homeless.

The main contributor to homelessness is a lack of housing supply and rising home values. Interpersonal and individual factors, such as mental illness and addiction, also play a role in explaining homelessness. However, mental illness and addiction play a weaker role than structural socio-economic factors, as West Coast cities such as Seattle, Portland, San Francisco, and Los Angeles have homelessness rates five times that of areas with much lower housing costs like Arkansas, West Virginia, and Detroit, even though the latter locations have high burdens of opioid addiction and poverty.

Historically, homelessness emerged as a national issue in the 1870s. Early homeless people lived in emerging urban cities, such as New York City. Into the 20th century, the Great Depression of the 1930s caused a substantial rise in homelessness. In 1990, the U.S. Census Bureau estimated the homeless population to be of 228,621, or 0.09% of the 248,709,873 enumerated in the 1990 U.S. census, which homelessness advocates criticized as an undercount. In the 21st century, the Great Recession of the late 2000s and the resulting economic stagnation and downturn have been major driving factors and contributors to rising homelessness rates. Increases in homelessness broke records in 2022 and in 2023. In 2023, record levels of homelessness have been declared in Los Angeles and New York City, and other cities around the country have reported increased levels of homelessness, with the main drivers being a shortage of affordable housing and the increased cost of living. In 2024, homelessness increased by a record 18%.

Health complications are a significant concern for homeless people, as lack of residence inhibits hygiene and access to healthy food, and exposes individuals to both cold and heat stress, violence, and traffic deaths. This contributes to increased mortality rates. In City of Grants Pass v. Johnson (2024), the U.S. Supreme Court ruled that anti-camping laws do not constitute a cruel and unusual punishment under the 8th Amendment even when no shelter is available, allowing cities to jail and fine homeless people for sleeping and camping outside.

Many Americans who cannot afford normal housing live in their cars or recreational vehicles (RVs). About a million people in the USA live full-time in RVs, according to the RV Industry Association, some of them just can’t afford normal housing, but many do it by choice.

== History ==
=== Pre-colonial and colonial periods ===
Following the 1381 Peasants' Revolt in England, constables were authorized under 1383 English Poor Laws to collar vagabonds and force them to show support. If they could not, the penalty was gaol.

Vagabonds could be sentenced to the stocks for three days and nights. In 1530, whipping was added. The presumption was that vagabonds were unlicensed beggars. In 1547, a bill was passed that subjected vagrants to some of the more extreme provisions of the criminal law, namely two years' servitude and branding with a "V" as the penalty for the first offense and death for the second.

Large numbers of vagabonds were among the convicts transported to the American colonies in the 18th century. Many became homeless.

=== African American homelessness ===
According to historian Roberta Ann Johnson, American slavery in the Southern colonies led to homelessness for free Blacks. Runaway slaves represented an early example of American homelessness. Native Americans at times provided a safe haven for runaway slaves. During the Civil War (1861–1865), many slaves escaped and became homeless. The Union Army provided protection and some housing aid and employment to these refugees. During the Reconstruction era after the war, large-scale operations by Freedmen's Bureau provided employment for many homeless until it closed in 1872. Most former slaves became tenant farmers, sharecroppers, or day laborers on cotton or tobacco farms.

In the Great Migration after 1914, many Southern Blacks moved to large Northern cities, and some became homeless in segregated neighborhoods. Large-scale unemployment in the Great Depression of the 1930s disproportionately affected Black Americans. They received federal aid in proportion to their numbers, but it was not proportionate to their needs. The New Deal operated a major farm program but it helped owners more than tenants, many of whom became homeless. After 1965, urban renewal reduced the number of affordable housing units available to Blacks, forcing them to double up in housing units in the remaining slum areas.

=== Urbanization in the late 19th century ===
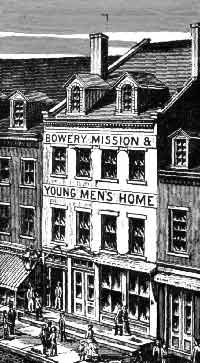
The Bowery Mission at 36 Bowery in New York City, c. 1880s

Homelessness emerged as a national issue in the 1870s. There are no national figures documenting homeless people's demography at this time. Jacob Riis wrote about, documented, and photographed the poor and destitute, although not specifically homeless people, in New York City tenements in the late 19th century. His book, How the Other Half Lives, published in 1890, raised public awareness of living conditions in the slums, causing some changes in building codes and some social conditions.

The growing movement toward social concern sparked the development of rescue missions, such as America's first rescue mission, the New York City Rescue Mission, founded in 1872 by Jerry and Maria McAuley. In smaller towns, there were hobos, who temporarily lived near train tracks and hopped onto trains to various destinations. Especially following the American Civil War, a large number of homeless men formed part of a counterculture known as "hobohemia" all over America.

By the late 19th century, many American towns and cities had significant numbers of homeless people. In New York City, for example, there was an area known as "the Bowery". Rescue missions offering "soup, soap, and salvation", a phrase introduced by The Salvation Army, sprang up along the Bowery thoroughfare, including the oldest one, The Bowery Mission. The mission was founded in 1879 by the Rev. and Mrs. A.G. Ruliffson.

=== 20th century ===
==== 1930s: The Great Depression ====
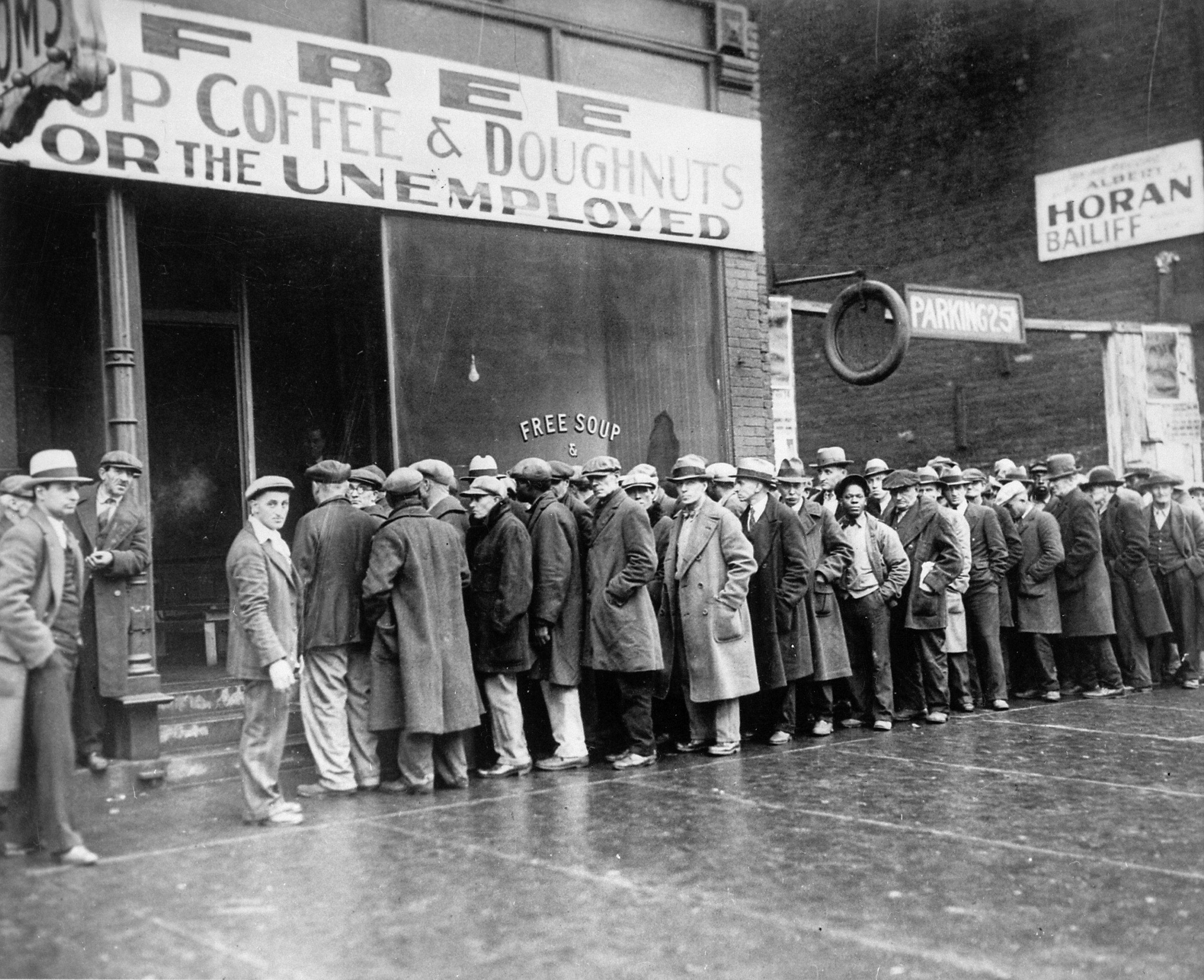
Unemployed men outside a soup kitchen in Depression-era Chicago, 1931

The Great Depression of 1929-1939 caused a devastating epidemic of poverty, hunger, and homelessness for one to two million people at any one time, with a great deal of turnover. As local charities and cities were overwhelmed, the homeless created self-governed shantytowns known as "Hoovervilles." Built from scrap materials in vacant lots near railroad yards, these poverty-stricken settlements housed hundreds or even thousands of displaced young men, with some women and children. Residents lived in makeshift shacks and begged for food or went to soup kitchens run by charities and churches. Local authorities did not officially recognize these Hoovervilles, but they were tolerated out of necessity. By early 1933 about 1.5 million people were lacking shelter. Because state laws denied aid to non-residents, the New Deal under President Franklin Roosevelt created the "Federal Transient Program" (FTP) in May 1933 as part of the new Federal Emergency Relief Administration (FERA), run by Harry Hopkins. FTP covered 100% of the local government costs for helping "transients" (those living in a state for less than a year). At its peak, the FTP operated over 600 facilities, providing food, medical care, housing and some jobs to about 1 million people. Most of those served were young, white, native-born working-class men, though women and African Americans were also present. By 1935, the federal government began phasing out direct relief like the FTP in favor of the "Second New Deal". Several factors drove this change. The FTP was so successful at clearing the streets that public urgency regarding homelessness faded. Officials like Harry Hopkins feared direct relief created "dependency" and pulled men away from traditional roles as family breadwinners. The new policy shifted toward public works run by the Works Progress Administration. (WPA) and long-term social safety nets especially Social Security. Shutting down the FTP in 1935 caused a resurgence of "hobo" life and left Dust Bowl migrants—like those famously depicted in the 1939 novel and film The Grapes of Wrath—with little federal support. Finally, the homelessness crisis ended between 1939 and 1941, when the booming World War II defense industries hired as many people as fast as possible.

==== 1960s and 1970s ====
A 1960 survey by Temple University of Philadelphia's poor neighborhoods found that 75 percent of the homeless were over 45 years old, and 87 percent were white.

The Community Mental Health Act of 1963 was a pre-disposing factor in setting the stage for homelessness in the United States. Long term psychiatric patients were released from state hospitals into single-room occupancies and sent to community health centers for treatment and follow-up. Never adequately funded, the community mental health system struggled to meet patient needs and many of the "deinstitutionalized" wound up living on the streets, with no sustainable support system. In the United States, during the late 1970s, the deinstitutionalization of patients from state psychiatric hospitals was a precipitating factor which seeded the population of people that are homeless, especially in urban areas such as New York City.

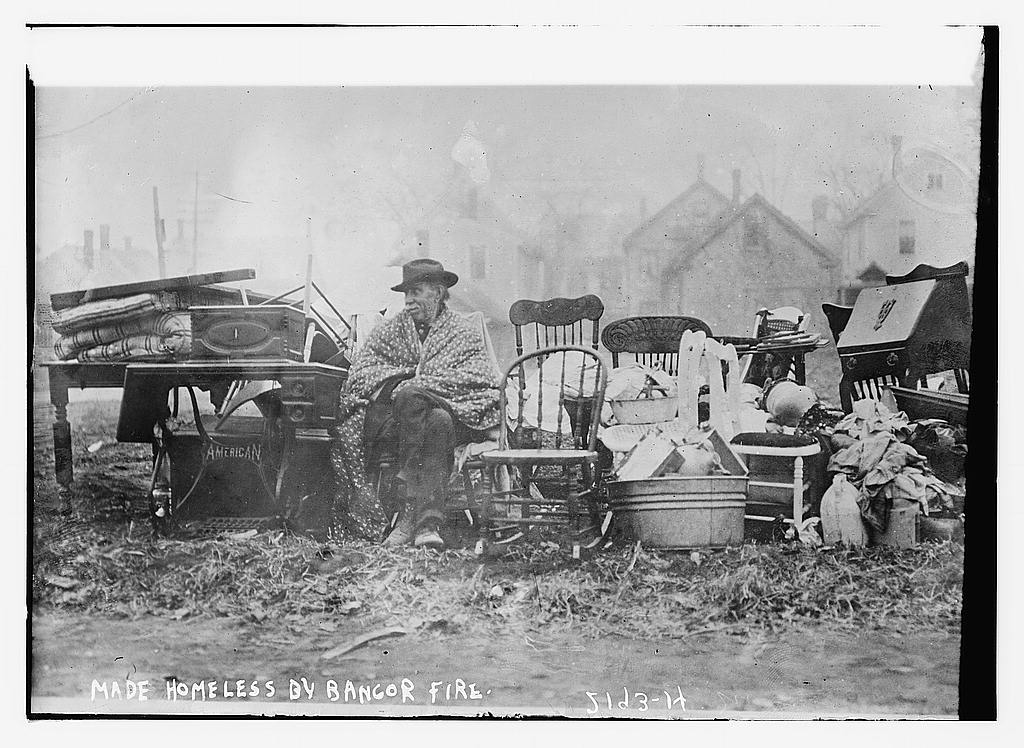
Displaced people after the Great Fire of 1911

==== 1980s and 1990s ====
The number of homeless people grew in the 1980s, nearly doubling from 1984 to 1987. According to Don Mitchell, this was in part due to the neoliberal reforms of the Reagan presidency, as housing and social service cuts increased and also the economy suffered a recession early in the decade. In 1984, the Federal government determined that somewhere between 200,000 and 500,000 Americans were homeless. There were some U.S. federal initiatives that aimed to help, end and prevent homelessness. However, there were no designated homeless-related programs in the Office of Management and Budget. Tent cities, which had largely vanished during the post-war period, began to re-emerge during this time.

The history of the United States in the 1980s illustrates that this was a time when there was economic distress, and high unemployment at points, and was the period when chronic homelessness became a societal problem. In 1980, federal funds accounted for 22% of big city budgets. By 1989, the similar aid composed only 6% of urban revenue, part of a larger 60% decrease in federal spending to support local governments. It is largely, although not exclusively, in these urban areas, that homelessness became widespread and reached unprecedented numbers.

Most notable were cuts to federal low-income housing programs. Congress halved the budget for public housing and Section 8, the government's housing voucher subsidization program, and that between 1980 and 1989, HUD's budget authority was reduced from $74 billion, to $19 billion. Such changes are claimed to have resulted in an inadequate supply of affordable housing to meet the growing demand of low-income populations. In 1970, there were 300,000 more low-cost rental units (6.5 million) than low-income renter households (6.2 million). By 1985, the advocacy group claimed that the number of low-cost units had fallen to 5.6 million, and the number of low-income renter households had grown to 8.9 million, a disparity of 3.3 million units.

In response to the ensuing homelessness crisis of the 1980s and after many years of advocacy and numerous revisions, President Reagan signed into law the McKinney–Vento Homeless Assistance Act in 1987. This remains the only piece of federal legislation that allocates funding to the direct service of homeless people. The McKinney–Vento Act paved the way for service providers in the coming years. In the 1990s, homeless shelters, soup kitchens, and other supportive services sprouted up in towns and cities nationally. Despite these efforts and the dramatic economic growth marked by this decade, homeless numbers rose and remained high from 1990 to 1999 according to the "coalition for the homeless" webpage.

It became increasingly apparent that simply providing services to alleviate the symptoms of homelessness, such as shelter beds, hot meals, psychiatric counseling, although needed, were not successful at solving the root causes of homelessness. In 1987, the United States Interagency Council on Homelessness (USICH), a federal agency contained in the Executive Branch, was established as a requirement of the McKinney–Vento Act of 1987.

Historically, the U.S. has approached addressing homelessness through a Treatment First approach, which operates on the idea that housing must be earned through abstinence from substance use or mental health treatment. In the 1980s, the Housing First approach raised a challenge to Treatment First. The Housing First approach, initially developed by homeless advocates, operates on the idea that housing is a right, and individuals have the option to address other underlying issues after they are housed. The federal government adopted Housing First as the primary solution to ending homelessness. To implement this model, permanent supportive housing (PSH) was ascribed as a key solution to reducing homelessness. It is argued that Housing First is more effective in addressing homelessness than Treatment First as it prioritizes a person's wellbeing over cost efficiency. Housing reduces persons experiencing homelessness' exposure to health risks and mental health strains.

A 1990 survey found that most homeless people were unable to bathe or shower.

In 1992, the National Commission on Severely Distressed Public Housing published a report identifying 6% of public housing as "severely distressed". This led to a 5 billion dollar funding package, HOPE VI, for replacing distressed public housing with mixed-income developments. The demolition of SROs was incentivized by increased real estate prices and neighborhood pressure, resulting in the teardown of more units than were initially identified. Redevelopments did not include nearly as many units of public housing as were demolished, decreasing the total stock of public housing and putting more people on the streets.

=== 21st century ===
==== 2001–2020 ====
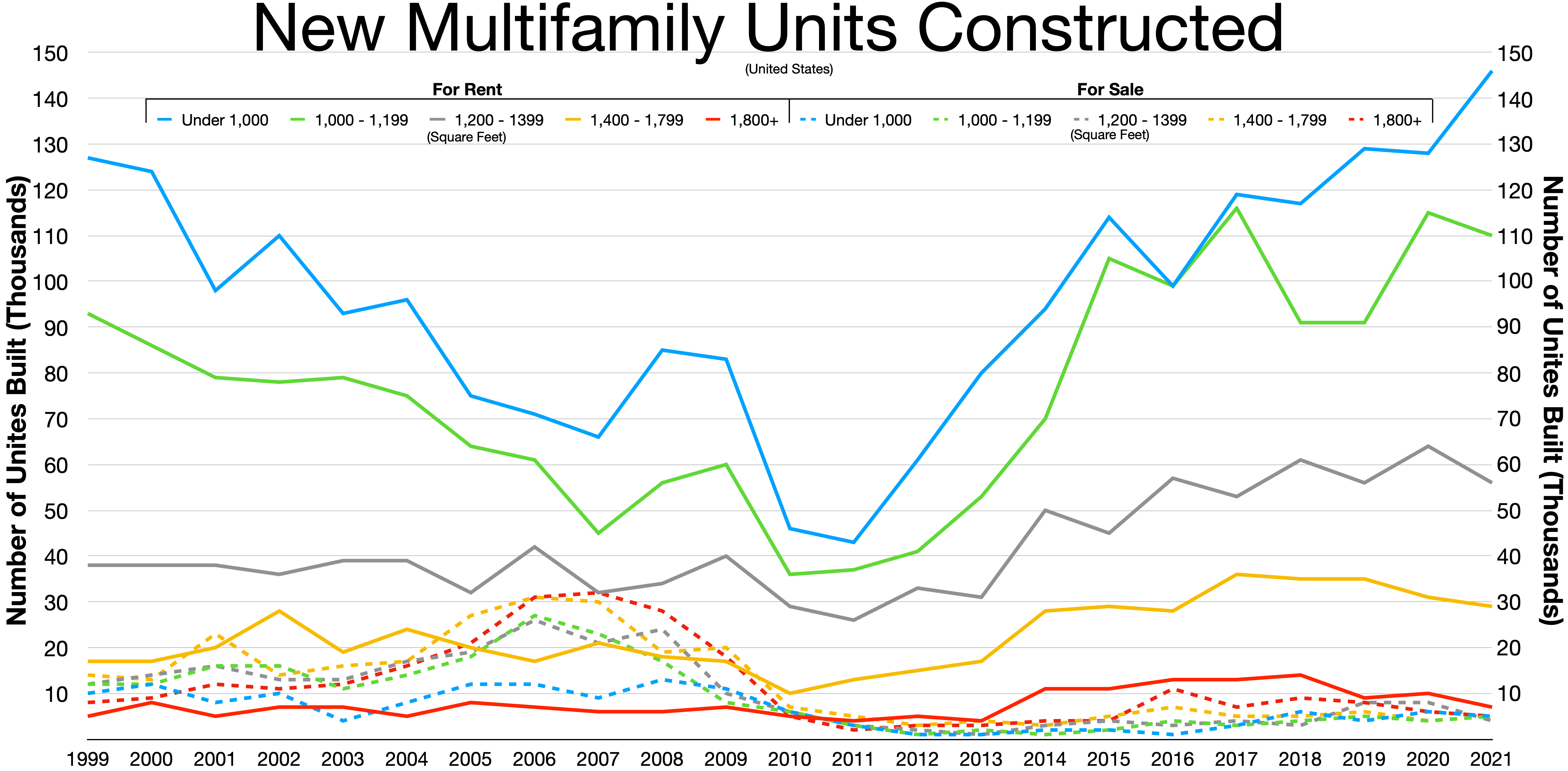
New multifamily units constructed, 1999 to 2021. For rent: Under 1,000 ft^{2}; 1,000 - 1,199 ft^{2}; 1,200 - 1,399 ft^{2}; 1,400 - 1,799 ft^{2}; 1,800+ ft^{2}; For Sale: Under 1,000 ft^{2}; 1,000 - 1,199 ft^{2}; 1,200 - 1,399 ft^{2}; 1,400 - 1,799 ft^{2}; 1,800+ ft^{2}

According to the U.S. Conference of Mayors, the demand for emergency shelter in 270 U.S. cities increased 13 percent in 2001 and 25 percent in 2005. Twenty-two percent of those requesting emergency shelter were turned away.

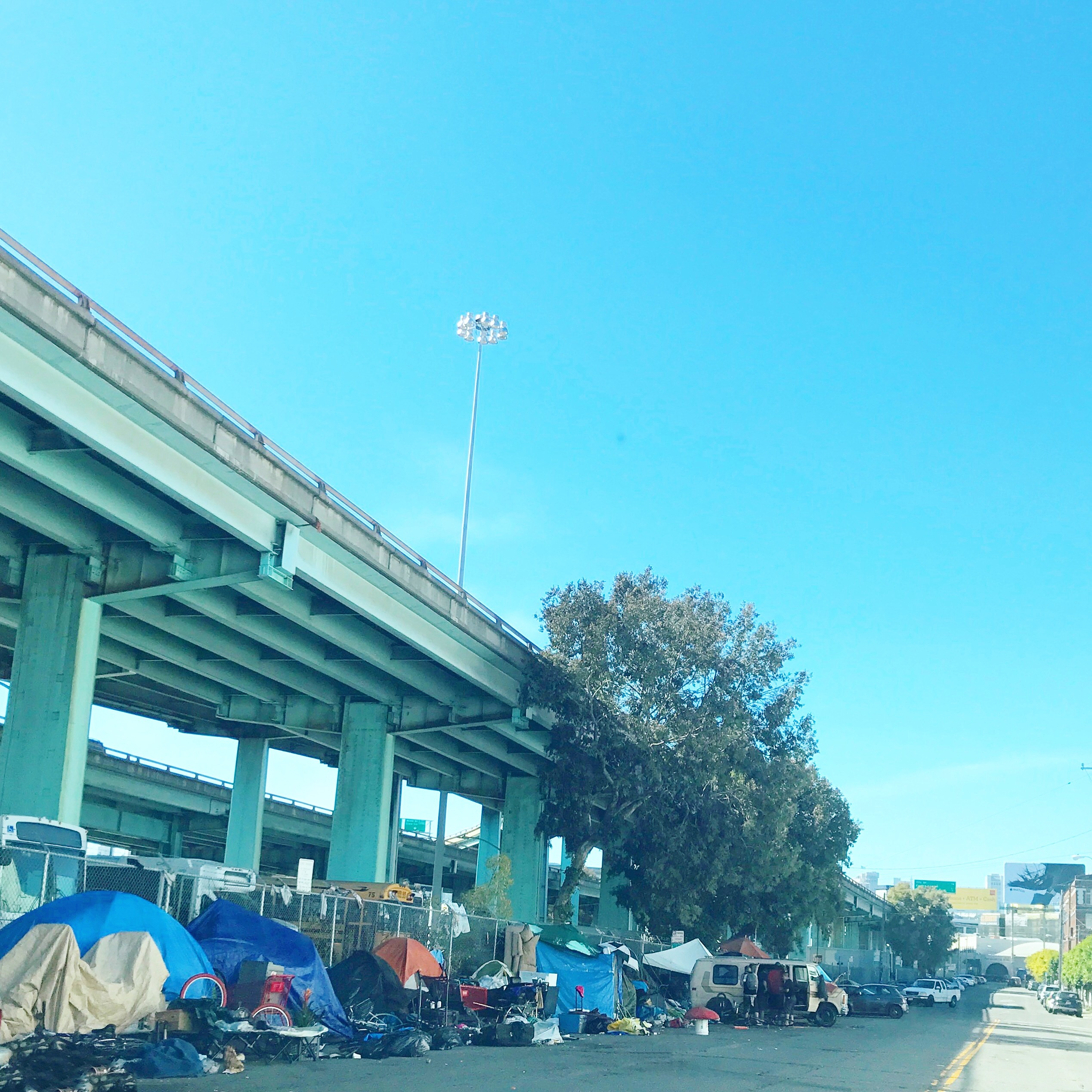
Tents of homeless people in San Francisco, 2017

Homelessness increased during the Great Recession in the United States as standards of living fell with less tax revenue available for public services, rising unemployment, and higher foreclosure rates.

In response to the Great Recession, President Obama signed several pieces of legislation that addressed the homelessness crisis. The American Recovery and Reinvestment Act of 2009 addressed homelessness prevention, in which he allocated an additional $1.5 billion to HUD for the "Homelessness Prevention and Rapid Rehousing Program (HPRP)." The purpose of HPRP was to assist individuals and families who are otherwise healthy and not chronically homeless in escaping homelessness or preventing homelessness of the vulnerable population.

In May 2009, President Obama signed the Homeless Emergency Assistance and Rapid Transition to Housing (HEARTH) Act, reauthorizing HUDs Homeless Assistance programs. It was part of the Helping Families Save Their Homes Act of 2009. The HEARTH act allows for the prevention of homelessness, rapid re-housing, consolidation of housing programs, and new homeless categories.

In 2011, the Federal government launched of Opening Doors: The Federal Strategic Plan to Prevent and End Homelessness. Opening Doors is a publication of the U.S. Interagency Council on Homelessness, which worked with all Federal agencies and many state and local stakeholders on its creation and vision, setting a ten-year path on preventing and ending all types of homelessness. This plan was presented to the President and Congress in a White House Ceremony in June 2010.

I've got economically zero unemployment in my city, and I've got thousands of homeless people that actually are working and just can't afford housing. There's nowhere for these folks to move to.

— Seattle City Council member Mike O'Brien on the explosion of homelessness on the West Coast, 2019.

In New York City, the number of homeless people using nightly shelter service tripled from about 20,000 to more than 60,000 between January 2000 and January 2015. By 2016, homelessness was considered an epidemic in several U.S. cities. In 2016, Los Angeles Mayor Eric Garcetti and seven of the 15 City Council members announced they would declare a state of emergency and try to find $100 million "to cure what has become a municipal curse."

In September 2018, in Martin v. City of Boise, the United States Court of Appeals for the Ninth Circuit ruled that the city's Camping and Disorderly Conduct Ordinances violated the Eighth Amendment's prohibition on cruel and unusual punishment. Cities cannot punish homeless people for sleeping in public when the homeless shelters are full.

During the COVID-19 pandemic in the United States, mass job loss and unemployment led to fears of mass evictions, as tenants became unable to pay rent. According to US government sources, homelessness has increased drastically, particularly in the US West, as real estate shortages drove up rents even higher, when people from already lower income levels were laid off from their jobs and evicted from existing housing. The estimates for homeless persons in the US during the COVID-19 pandemic range from 600,000 to 1.5 million people, making the US the worst affected industrialized country with regard to unhoused individuals.

In 2020, local city governments in California and Oregon started to intensify anti-homelessness campaigns, with limited success as local citizens reported extensive sprawls of homeless people in parks and public areas, creating unsanitary conditions with negative effects on small businesses. In March 2021, there were an estimated 6.4 million American households that were behind on rent.

Due to COVID, the Department of Housing and Urban Development's 2021 report to Congress on the state of homelessness in the United States was unable to perform an accurate count of unsheltered homeless individuals. Instead, the report focused on point-in-time counts of sheltered homeless peoples.

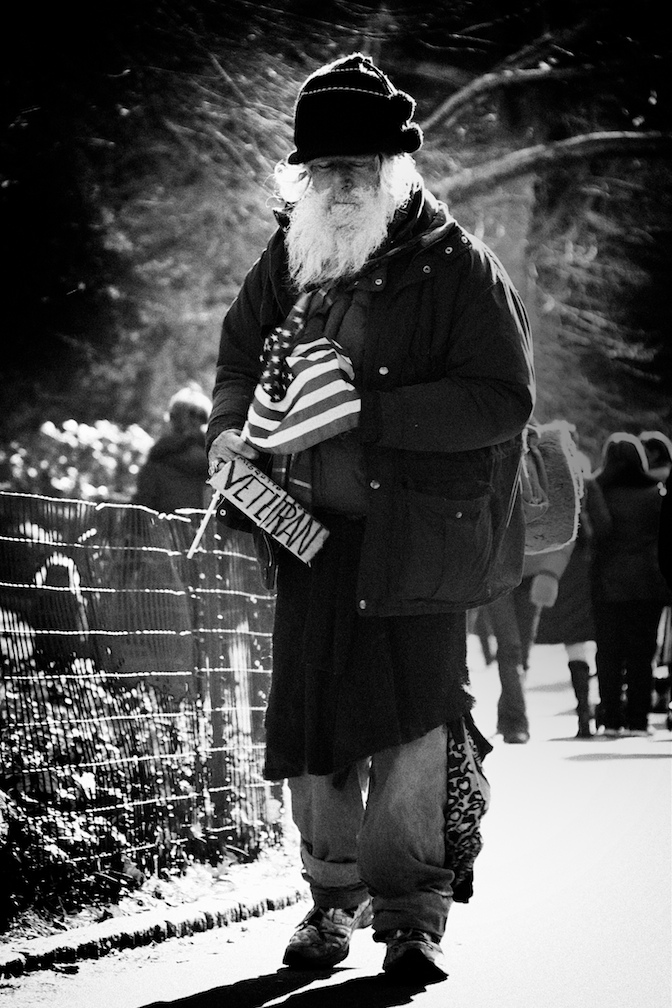
A homeless veteran in New York, 2008

==== Improved data ====
Over the past decades, the availability and quality of data on homelessness has improved considerably, due, in part, to initiatives by the United States government. Since 2007, the US Department of Housing and Urban Development has issued an Annual Homeless Assessment Report, which revealed the number of individuals and families that were homeless, both sheltered and unsheltered.

In the US Department of Housing and Urban Development's 2008 Annual Homeless Assessment Report, the most common demographic features of all sheltered homeless people are: male, members of minority groups, older than age 31, and alone. More than 40 percent of sheltered homeless people have a disability. At the same time, sizable segments of the sheltered homeless population are white, non-Hispanic (38 percent), children (20 percent), or part of multi-person households (33 percent). About 68 percent of the 1.6 million sheltered homeless people were homeless as individuals and 32 percent were persons in families.

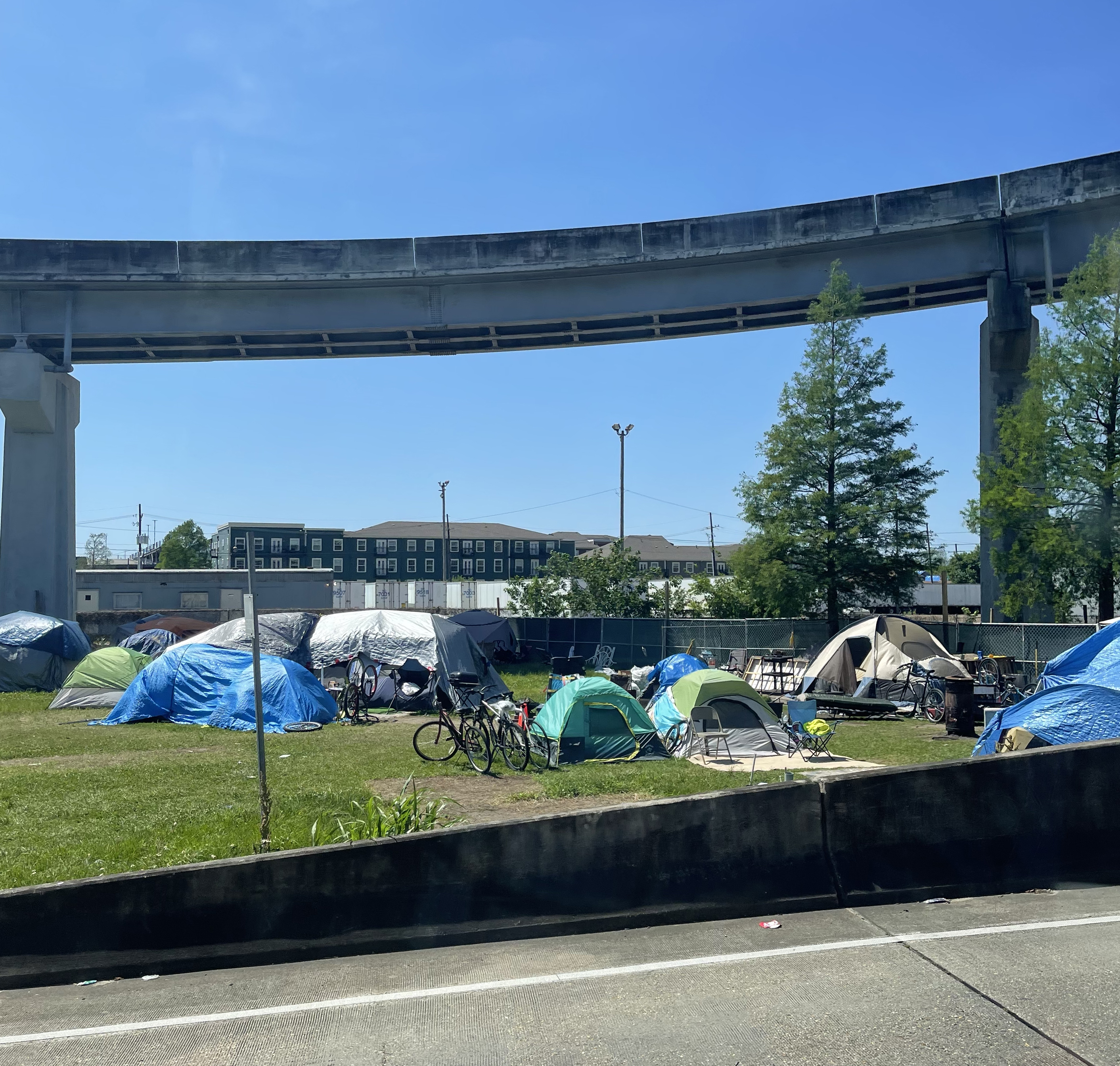
A homeless camp in New Orleans, March 2023

In 2008, more than 66% of all sheltered homeless people were located in principal cities, with 32% located in suburban or rural jurisdictions. About 40% of people entering an emergency shelter or transitional housing program during 2008 came from another homeless situation (sheltered or unsheltered), 40% came from a housed situation (in their own or someone else's home), and the remaining 20% were split between institutional settings or other situations such as hotels or motels. Most people had relatively short lengths of stay in emergency shelters: 60% stayed less than a month, and a 33% stayed a week or less.

In 2009, there were about 643,000 sheltered and unsheltered homeless persons nationwide. About two-thirds of those stayed in emergency shelters or used transitional housing programs. The remainder lived on the street in abandoned buildings or other areas not meant for human habitation. About 1.56 million people, or about 0.5% of the U.S. population, used an emergency shelter or a transitional housing program between October 1, 2008, and September 30, 2009. Around 44% of homeless people were employed. In 2009, it was estimated that one out of 50 children or 1.5 million children in the United States of America would experience some form of homelessness each year.

There were an estimated 37,878 homeless veterans in the United States in January 2017, or 8.6 percent of all homeless adults, compared with about 7 percent of the U.S. adult population in 2018 that were military veterans. In 2013, Texas, California and Florida had the highest numbers of unaccompanied homeless youth under the age of 18, comprising 58% of the total homeless under 18 youth population. In 2020, New York City reported it had about 114,000 temporarily homeless school children.

From 2007 to 2015, homelessness appeared, from the federal survey, to be in decline. Beginning in 2016, the surveys showed a steady increase in homelessness, particularly among the unsheltered.

The COVID-19 pandemic, and associated economic downturn, housing shortages and housing price inflation, outpacing wage growth, and the end of government protections and assistance to counter the economic effects of COVID-19—along with the explosive growth in addictions to methamphetamine, opioids, and Fentanyl -- contributed to a sharp rise in homelessness in the early 2020s. By 2023, according to the federal survey, a record 653,104 homeless were identified in the annual federal survey—a 12% jump over the previous year, quadruple any other year's increase, with increases in every category and demographic of homelessness.

In June 2024, the U.S. Supreme Court issued a ruling in the case Grants Pass v. Johnson that allowed for cities to ban homeless encampments. The homeless population in the United States rose by more than 18 percent in a single year in 2024, government officials said, driven by high housing costs, natural disasters and increased migration to big cities. According to the poll, the number of homeless people on a given night in January 2024 was more than 770,000. Children under 18 experienced the largest increase, with nearly 150,000 homeless on survey night. Overall, family homelessness is up 39 percent from the previous year.

In January 2025, there were 745,652 homeless individuals in the U.S., showing a slight decrease from 2024’s high. Twenty-two states and Washington, D.C. saw decreases, with New York and Illinois having the largest drops. These states had earlier increased in homelessness due to rising immigration. In 2025, changes in federal immigration policy may have helped with the decreases. Most homeless individuals stayed in emergency shelters, and data on housing availability is also collected.

== Causes ==
Lack of available and affordable housing as a cause of homelessness was named at the 2004 United States Conference of Mayors, surveying the mayors of major cities on the extent and causes of urban homelessness. The next three causes identified by mayors, in rank order, were mental illness or the lack of needed services, substance use and lack of needed services, and low-paying jobs. The lowest ranking cause, cited by five mayors, was prisoner reentry. Other causes cited were unemployment, domestic violence, and poverty.

The major causes of homelessness include:

- Lack of affordable housing throughout much of the country is considered the "root cause" of the contemporary homelessness crisis. Writing for The Atlantic in 2023, Jerusalem Demsas says that "homelessness is primarily a function of the broader housing-unaffordability crisis, which in turn is primarily a function of how difficult local governments have made building new housing in the places that need it the most."
- Lack of sufficient urban housing projects to provide safe, secure, and affordable housing to the financially underprivileged. For low-wage workers, rents can be unaffordable in areas where their workplace is located.
- The deinstitutionalization movement from the 1950s onwards in state mental health systems, to shift towards 'community-based' treatment of the mentally ill, as opposed to long-term commitment in institutions. There is disproportionally higher prevalence of mental disorders relative to other disease groups within homeless patient populations, at both inpatient hospitals and hospital-based emergency departments.
- Redevelopment and gentrification activities instituted by cities, through which low-income neighborhoods are declared blighted and demolished, to make way for projects that generate higher property taxes and other revenue, creating a shortage of housing affordable to low-income working families, the elderly poor, and the disabled.
- Nearly half of foster children in the United States become homeless when they are released from foster care at age 18.
- Natural disasters that destroy homes: hurricanes, floods, earthquakes, etc. Places of employment are often destroyed, causing unemployment and transience.
- People who have served time in prison, have used addictive substances, or have a history of mental illness find it difficult to find employment for years at a time because of the use of computer background checks by potential employers. Also inclusive of registered sex offenders who are considered unwelcome in some metropolitan areas. See prisoner reentry.
- People with criminal charges at large that are in hiding seeking to evade law enforcement.
- Adults and children who flee domestic violence.
- Teenagers who flee or are thrown out by parents who disapprove of their child's sexual orientation or gender identity. A 2010 study by the Center for American Progress shows that a disproportionately high number of homeless youth, between 20 and 40%, are gay or transgender.
- Complex building codes which can make it difficult to build and construct. Traditional huts, cars, and tents can be illegal, classified as substandard and may require removal by the owner or be subject to removal by the government.

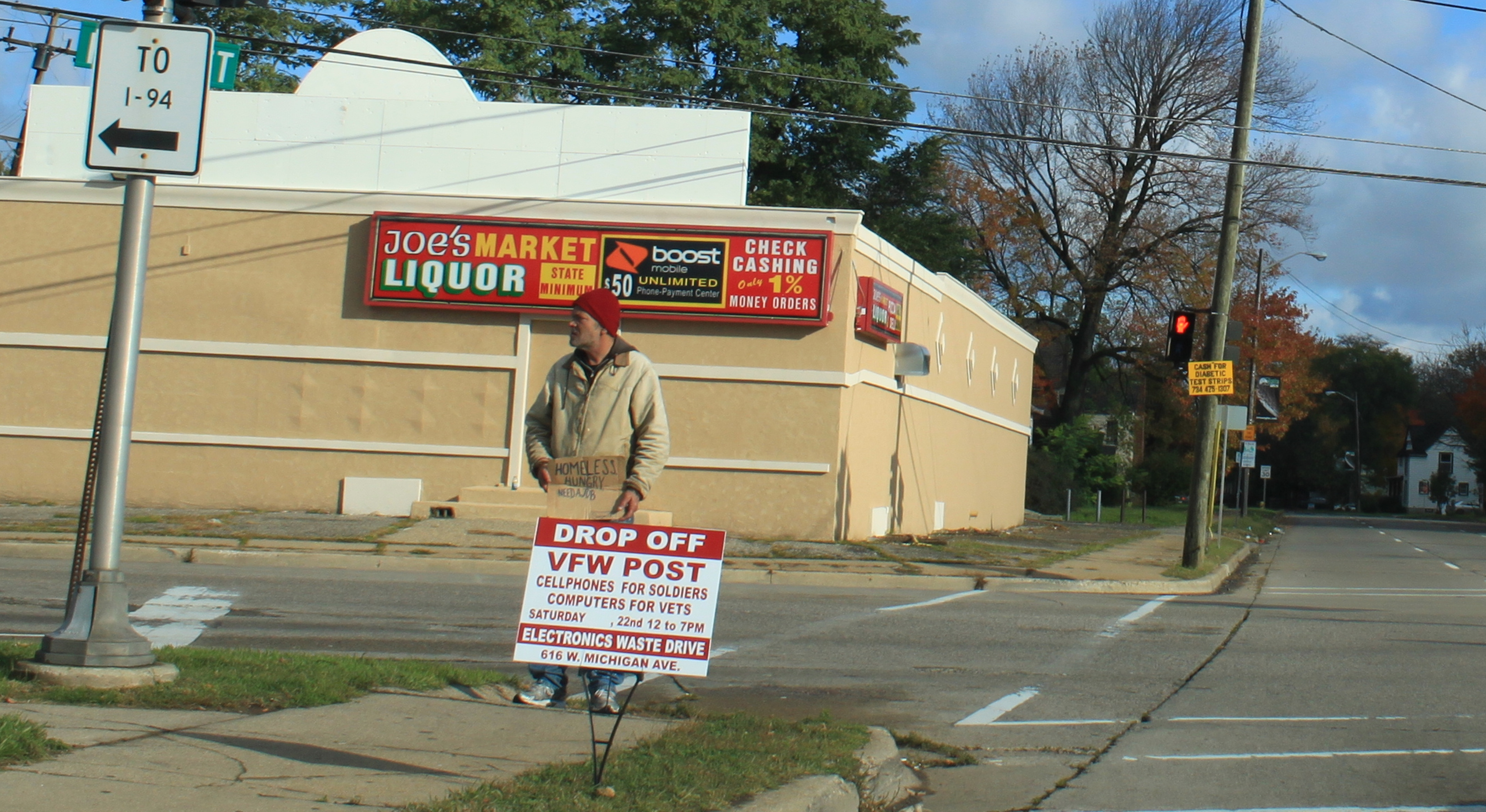
Homeless soliciting employment, Ypsilanti, Michigan

- Foreclosures of homes, including foreclosure of apartment complexes which displaces tenants renting there.
- Evictions from rented property.
- Lack of support from friends or family.
- Individuals who prefer homelessness and wish to remain off the grid for political and ideological purposes. Often self-identified as gutter punks or urban survivalists. The Department of Housing and Urban Development rarely reports on this counter-cultural movement, since its adherents often refuse to participate in governmental studies and do not seek governmental assistance for ideological or political purposes.
- Lack of resources in place in the communities to help aid in prevention of homelessness before it becomes a crisis.
- Neoliberal policies, reforms to the welfare state and the retrenchment of the social safety net.
- High rents, in particular areas where individuals could pay over a third of their income on rent and related costs increase the potential of homelessness. In poor communities, landlords increase the rent burden on tenants in what they perceive to be risky investments, extracting more profits from them than their counterparts in more affluent communities, which according to sociologist Matthew Desmond and his colleague, "directly contributes to their economic scarcity and hardship and is a source of residential insecurity, eviction, and homelessness."
- Low-income workers are at increased risk of homelessness as wages for the typical American worker have stagnated over the last three decades, while housing costs have climbed, according to the National Alliance to End Homelessness.

=== Adverse childhood experiences ===
In a study on adverse childhood experiences, "Nearly nine in ten homeless adults have been exposed to at least one early traumatic experience, and more than half of homeless adults have been exposed to four or more early traumatic experiences".

=== Unaffordable housing ===
Homelessness is driven by a number of causes, but one of the most direct causes is a lack of affordable housing. According to the United States Interagency Council on Homelessness, "affordable housing shortages" is among the top policy-related causes of homelessness, and 40-60% of homeless people have a job, yet still cannot afford housing. In academic research, homelessness rates are directly correlated with increases in rent, most notably when the cost of rent in an area exceeds 30% of an area's median income. In 2023, the surge in homelessness has been linked to soaring rents eating away at any worker wage gains not only in California and Washington, but also Arizona, Ohio, Tennessee and Texas.

In 2024, in California in particular, high housing costs were found to be a key driver of homelessness. A 2023 survey of homeless individuals in California found that among typical causes of homelessness, many people were driven into homelessness due to high rents and low incomes which could not cover the cost of rent. In San Diego, according to a 2023 report by the Private Equity Stakeholder Project, Blackstone Inc. has contributed to the problem through aggressive evictions and rent increases of some 43-64% on vacant properties in two years.

In a 2022 book titled "Homelessness is a Housing Problem", Clayton Page Aldern, a policy analyst and data scientist in Seattle, and Gregg Colburn, an assistant professor of real estate at the University of Washington's College of Built Environments, studied homelessness rates across the country, along with what possible factors might be influencing the rates. They found that high rates of homelessness are caused by shortages of affordable housing, not by mental illness, drug addiction, or poverty. They found that mental illness, drug addiction and poverty occur nationwide, but not all places have equally expensive housing costs. One example cited is that two states with high rates of opioid addiction, Arkansas and West Virginia, both have low per capita rates of homelessness, because of low housing prices. With respect to poverty, the city of Detroit is one of the poorest cities, yet Detroit's homelessness rate is 20% that of West Coast cities like Seattle, Portland, San Francisco, Los Angeles, and San Diego.

== Definitions and categories ==
The United States Department of Housing and Urban Development acknowledges four categories of people who qualify as legally homeless: (1) those who are currently homeless, (2) those who will become homeless in the imminent future, (3) certain youths and families with children who suffer from home instability caused by a hardship, and (4) those who suffer from home instability caused by domestic violence.

According to the 1994 Stewart B. McKinney Act, a person is considered homeless if they "lack a fixed, regular, and adequate nighttime residence and ... has a primary nighttime residency that is: (A) a supervised publicly or privately operated shelter designed to provide temporary living accommodations... (B) an institution that provides a temporary residence for individuals intended to be institutionalized, or (C) a public or private place not designed for, or ordinarily used as, a regular sleeping accommodation for human beings."

=== Homeless veterans ===
Homeless veterans are persons who have served in the armed forces, who are homeless or living without access to secure and appropriate accommodation. In January 2020, by HUD point-in-time measurements, there were an estimated 37,252 homeless veterans in the United States, or 8 percent of all homeless adults. In 2020, just over 8 percent of homeless U.S. veterans were female.

Throughout the 21st century, homeless service providers and the Federal government have been able to reduce chronic homelessness and homelessness among Veterans with targeted efforts and interagency cooperation on initiatives, like the HUD-VASH program. Indeed, the prominent role of the Department of Veterans Affairs and its joined up approach to veteran welfare help to distinguish the US response to veteran homelessness internationally.

=== Youth homelessness ===
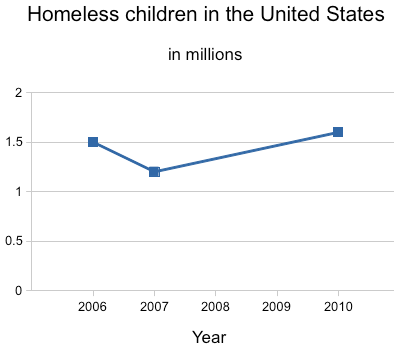
Homeless children in the United States: The number of homeless children reached record highs in 2011, 2012, and 2013 at about three times their number in 1983.

The number of homeless children in the US grew from 1.2 million in 2007 to 1.6 million in 2010. The US defines homelessness as "individuals who lack a fixed, regular, and adequate nighttime residence," per the 1987 McKinney–Vento Homeless Assistance Act. The number of homeless children reached record highs in 2011, 2012, and 2013 at about three times their number in 1983. In 2010, a study found that an "estimated two million [youth] run away from or are forced out of their homes each year" in the United States.

In 2009, one out of 50 children or 1.5 million children in United States of America was homeless each year. In 2013, that number jumped to one out of 30 children, or 2.5 million.

Texas, California and Florida have the highest numbers of unaccompanied homeless youth under the age of 18; comprising 58% of the total homeless under 18 youth population.

Street children in the United States tend to stay in the state. 83% do not leave their state of origin. If they leave, street children are likely to end up in large cities, notably New York City; Los Angeles; Portland, Oregon; and San Francisco. In 2010, street children were predominantly Caucasian and female in the United States, and 42% identify as lesbian, gay, bisexual, or transgender (LGBT).

The United States government has been making efforts since the late 1970s to accommodate this section of the population. The Runaway and Homeless Youth Act of 1978 made funding available for shelters and funded the National Runaway Switchboard. Other efforts include the Child Abuse and Treatment Act of 1974, the National Child Abuse and Neglect Data System, and the Juvenile Justice and Delinquency Prevention Act. There has been a decline of arrest rates in street youth, dropping in 30,000 arrests from 1998 to 2007. Instead, the authorities are referring homeless youth to state-run social service agencies.

In 2020, the National Center for homeless Education reported that in the U.S. public education system, over 1.5 million students experienced homelessness during their 2017 and 2018 school year.

According to the data, between 2023 and 2024, children under 18 saw a 33% increase in homelessness, with 150,000 children experiencing this crisis.

==== LGBTQ+ youth ====
According to the Massachusetts Youth Risk Behavior Survey, one in four teens that participated in this survey who identify as gay or lesbian are homeless. Various sources report between 20 percent and 40 percent identify as LGBT. 2015 research shows that a disproportionate number of homeless youth in the United States identify as lesbian, gay, bisexual or transgender, or LGBT.

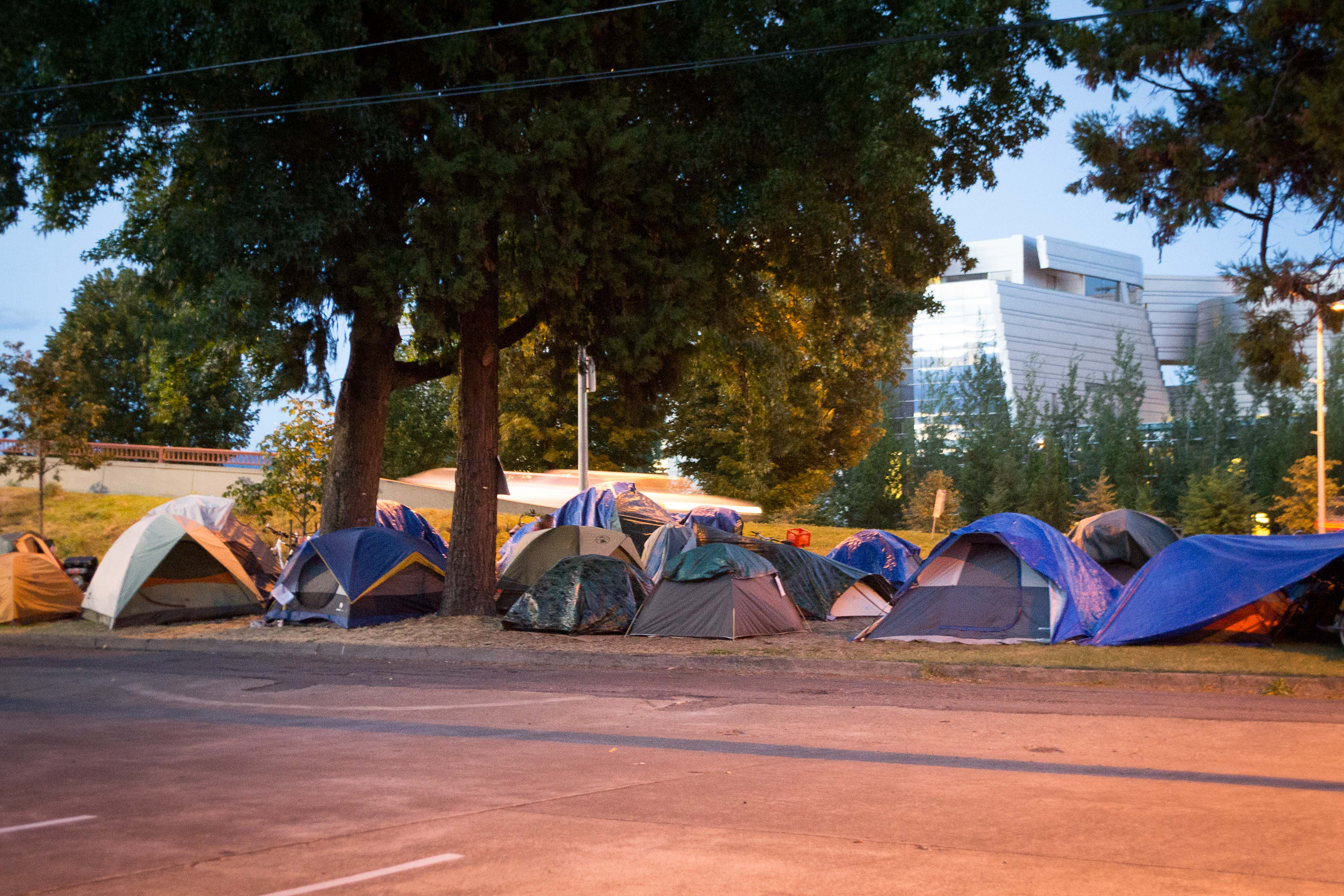
A homeless camp in Eugene, Oregon, 2013

=== Homeless families ===
The topic of homeless families first emerged in the United States during the 1980s, when social welfare programs were being cut and high rates of income inequality, child poverty, and the lack of affordable housing were becoming an issue. The issue of homeless families came back in 2009 after the Recession, which replicated the same issues from the 80s. The 2000s saw a new population of those experiencing homelessness: families with children. While an emerging problem at the beginning of the decade, the problem continued to persist to 2010.

At the close of the decade the trend continued, with the number of individuals in homeless families increasing from 431,541 in 2007 to 535,447 in 2009. Though the US Department of Housing and Urban Development (HUD) conducts an annual Point-in-Time count of homeless people, including homeless families, its methodology has been criticized for under-reporting the number of homeless families. HUD reported that the number of homeless families decreased by 2% from 2017 to 2018, and by 23% from 2007 to 2018. However, 85% of local services for homeless people reported an increase during the same time. While HUD reported 111,592 homeless minors in 2018, the United States Department of Education reported 1.3 million homeless minors in the 2016 – 2017 school year.

In 2019, the state of New York had the greatest number of homeless families, at 15,901. California had the second-greatest number of homeless families, at 7,044, followed by Massachusetts at 3,766. Wyoming had the fewest, at 37.

In 2024, the percentage of families with children experiencing homelessness increased by 39%.

==== Homeless women with children ====
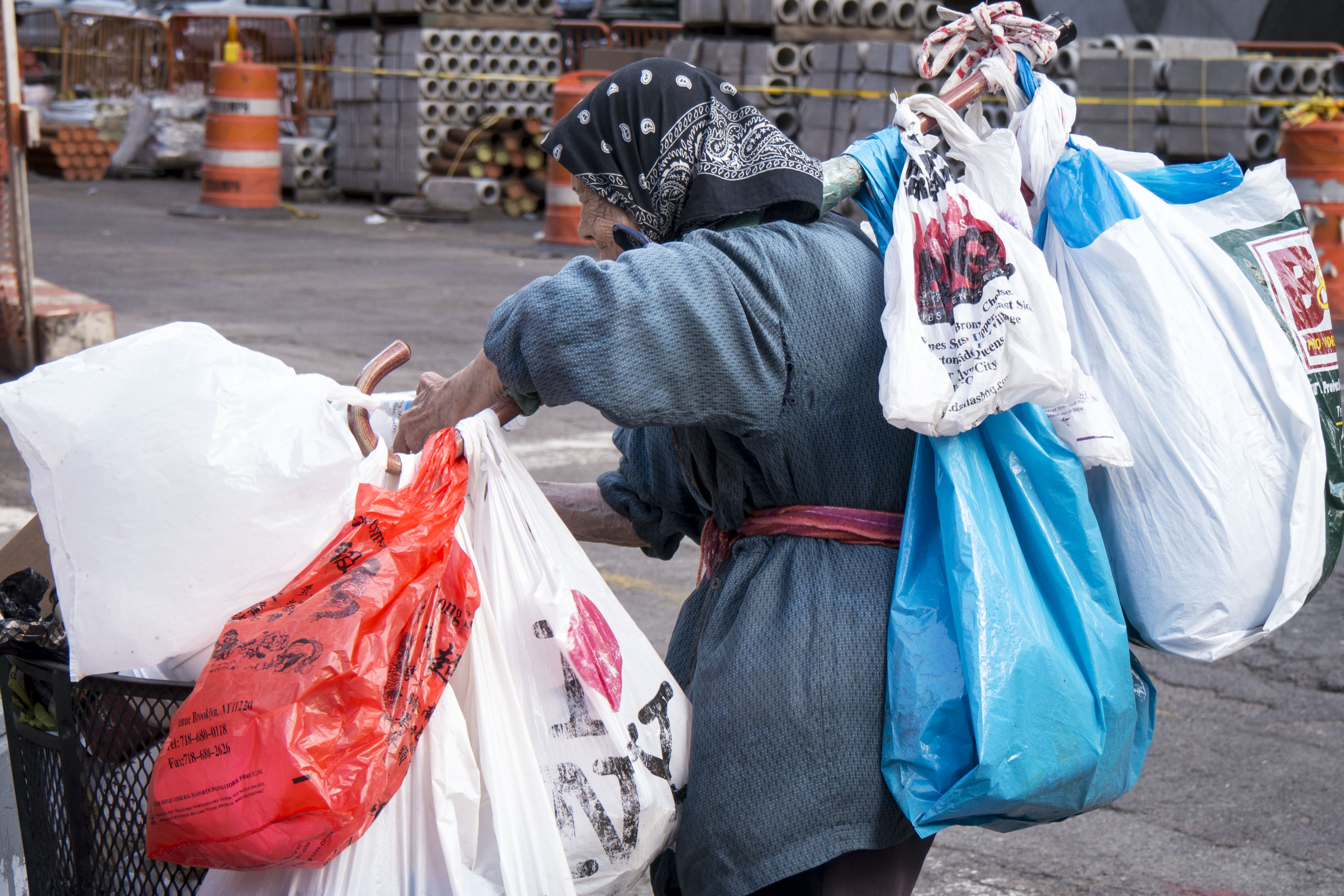
A homeless woman in NY

A 2007 study discovered that the three biggest risk factors that contributed to family homelessness in the United States are: ethnicity, lack of resources (specifically funds), and young children/pregnancy. There is a strong correlation between homeless families and households run and financed by a single female, especially one from a minority group and with at least two children. Single-income families, especially those below the federal poverty line, have a harder time finding housing than other families, especially given the limited affordable housing options.

Homeless families do not always take refuge in shelters, but being homeless also does not necessarily mean living on the streets. Homeless women with children are more likely to live with family or friends than those without children, and this group is treated with higher priority by both the government and society. In 2020, homeless mothers had a much higher prevalence of depression, at 40 to 85%, compared to 12% in women of all socioeconomic groups. Homeless mothers have higher rates of substance use, anxiety disorders, and PTSD. Nearly all of them (92%) experience physical or sexual abuse.

=== Chronic homelessness ===
Changes in different types of homelessness in the U.S. between 2011 and 2020

In 2017, about 85,000 chronically homeless people were sleeping on the streets or in shelters. A chronically homeless individual is defined as an unaccompanied person who has been homeless for a consecutive year, or four or more periods of homelessness within the last three years, with a disability preventing them from working. This definition was expanded in 2009 due to the HEARTH act, to include families who were experiencing prolonged or repeating homelessness due to a disabled parent. A 2017 study found that leaving these individuals to remain on the streets can cost taxpayers up to $50,000 per year for a single chronically homeless individual, by them cycling in and out of treatment facilities, jails, hospitals and other institutional care facilities. Since 2007, the number of chronically homeless individuals has decreased by 33%, with Utah reporting to have achieved an end to chronic homelessness.

=== Episodic homelessness ===
An episodic homeless person is someone that has experienced three instances of homelessness within a given year. After four instances within a year, they are classified as chronically homeless. Episodic homelessness usually afflicts younger people that are fighting health issues or addiction.

=== Transitional homelessness ===
Transitional homelessness is a type of homelessness that's a result of a major life change or catastrophic event. Those life events could include losing a job, a medical condition, divorce, domestic abuse, and more. It is likely that people experiencing episodic homelessness are young, and end up staying in shelters for a brief period.

=== Hidden homelessness ===
Hidden homelessness goes unreported and undocumented. Individuals who are classified as such are temporarily living with others with no guarantees for the long term.

The community of homeless people in the United States is aided by governmental and non-governmental organizations. According to the United States Department of Housing and Urban Development, in 2017, the number of people experiencing homelessness in unsheltered locations increased for a second straight year by 9% between 2016 and 2017. This issue is partly caused by a lack of affordable housing and is exacerbated by the criminalization of behaviors associated with homelessness. This problem is also costly for the country in supporting these individuals. Multiple studies have demonstrated success in reducing the homeless population as well as its harmful financial and societal effects by providing these individuals with a combination of housing without preconditions and supportive care. These studies include the 2014 Housing first implementation of the Department of Veterans Affairs National Center on Homelessness Among Veterans and a study performed through Brown University.

== Employment ==
Many homeless people in the United States work, both part-time and full-time. Employment opportunities can be useful in providing financial stability to homeless individuals. Estimates of unemployment within the homeless population range from 57% to 90%. Programs seeking to help homeless people find and maintain jobs usually focus on individual characteristics of homeless people as barriers, such as addiction and mental illness.

Research indicates that there are systemic factors that exclude homeless people from the work force, such as expectations, and the overall structure of the labor market. The rise of temporary employment in the modern labor market has made homeless people unable to secure stable employment and income, to ensure their ability to afford and maintain a house.

== Health ==
Homelessness is a public welfare and health epidemic within the United States. Any period of homelessness is associated with adverse health consequences. These adverse health consequences are associated with poor living conditions and a lack of access to treatment facilities. Due to living in extreme poverty, it is unlikely for an individual or a family to have a healthcare plan. These healthcare plans are important in obtaining treatment for illnesses or injury from treatment facilities. Without it, individuals and families are left to deal with their ailments themselves or endure further financial burden by receiving treatments without a health insurance plan.

Respiratory infections and outbreaks of tuberculosis and other aerosol transmitted infections have been reported. Homeless intravenous drug users are at an increased risk of contracting HIV, and hepatitis B and C infections.

The close living spaces of areas such as Skid Row in California provide an environment in which infectious diseases can spread easily. These areas with a high concentration of homeless individuals are dirty environments, with little resources for personal hygiene. A 2018 report to congress estimated that 35% of homeless people were in unsheltered locations not suitable for human habitation.

There is a bidirectional relationship between homelessness and poor health. Homelessness exacts a heavy toll on individuals. The longer individuals experience homelessness, the more likely they are to experience poor health and be at higher risk for premature death. Health conditions, such as substance use and mental illness, can increase people's susceptibility to homelessness. Conversely, homelessness can cause further health issues, due to constant exposure to environmental threats such as violence and communicable diseases. Homeless people have disproportionately high rates of poly substance use, mental illness, physical health problems and legal issues/barriers in attaining employment.

A 2000 study found that large numbers of homeless people work, but few homeless people are able to generate significant earnings from employment alone. Physical health problems limit work and daily activities, which are barriers to employment. Substance use is positively associated with a lower work level, and negatively related to a higher work level. Those with physical health problems are substantially more likely than those with mental health problems to be in the more generous disability programs. Substance use disorders are a barrier to participation in disability programs. A 2015 study found that rates of participation in government programs are low, and that people with major mental disorders have a low participation rate in disability programs.

=== Homeless deaths ===
US homeless deaths surged 77% from 2016 to 2020. A February 2022 analysis in The Guardian found that some 18,000 homeless people died on the streets and in encampments and shelters over a five year period, with 5,000 of these deaths occurring in 2020. The non-profit National Health Care for the Homeless Council places homeless deaths at between 17,000 and 40,000 annually. Many are never counted, given that the federal government does not track homeless deaths nationally.

The top direct causes of death among the homeless population include "drug overdoses, violence, traffic deaths and premature lethality of treatable conditions like heart disease." Regarding drug deaths, methamphetamine is a significant killer, as people who are homeless use the stimulant drug to stay awake and alert in order to protect themselves from violence. The report notes that outside of direct medical causes of death, a major factor contributing to both the epidemic of homelessness and surge in deaths among the homeless population is the lack of affordable housing throughout much of the country.

=== Homelessness among the elderly ===
A 2023 report found that Homelessness among the elderly has been increasing. A 2002 report by the Los Angeles County Department of Public Health found that homeless persons die at greater rates than the general public from specific causes. They are more likely to die by: 35 times from alcohol or drug overdoses, 16 times from auto accidents, 14 times from murder, 8 times from suicide, and 4 times from heart disease. September 2023 HUD data found that the elderly are the fastest growing demographic of the homeless population.

In 2023, Judge Milan Smith Jr., an American jurist claimed that homelessness is "presently the defining public health and safety crisis in the western United States." According to 2023 Los Angeles homeless services authority data, on average, six unhoused people die in Los Angeles each day. The causes reported of death are overdoses, heart disease, traffic accidents, homicides, hypothermia, and heat exhaustion. Va Lecia Adams Kellum, Lahsa's CEO, believes "The primary causes of homelessness are economic."

=== Comprehensive health care ===
Comprehensive healthcare usually refers to a form of medical care that meets a patient's whole needs through the provision of a wide range of health services. This form of holistic care in relation to homeless people is often difficult for them to access, due to issues of location, stigma, etc, and difficult for care givers to perform and manage, as a result of the unpredictability of homeless people day to day.

=== Tailored care approach ===
As high-risk and socially disadvantaged persons, homeless patients tend to require a lot of acute care, of short term but active treatment, with poor results. Due to the conditions homelessness creates, acute care and health is difficult to manage and maintain. The Tailored Care approach recognizes the situation of homeless people and seeks to provide specialized care to the homeless community. Studies have found that the tailored approach is good at engaging homeless persons seeking health care for the first time. These health care facilities position themselves in homeless shelters or in areas easily accessible to the homeless population. Some of these health care providers also provide meal kits, on-site showers, transportation, and hygiene kits. This form of holistic and tailored care leads to the reduction in emergency service use, and hospitalizations amongst the homeless community.

This approach has been used in the government-sponsored Health Care for the Homeless Model (HCH Model). Each HCH project is federally funded, and works as federally qualified health centers that work at the intersection of multiple disciplines. These health centers usually provide their patients access to health services such as primary care, mental health services, and addiction services, as well as social services such as after-jail services and case management. There is no set structure that each health center needs to follow—each health center has the agency to provide a variety of services based on their networks and connections with the local neighborhood, government, or community, but are not mandated to do so except for providing primary care.

=== Children's health ===
For children, there are risks to seeking refuge in shelters, which are heightened and more noticeable for children. Children's homelessness health risks include malnutrition from lack of access to food with nutritional content, behavioral problems associated with coping, social insecurity from growing up in an unstable environment, and mental illnesses such as PTSD and trauma. Homelessness can have a large impact on infant health, especially in the first few years of life. A 2019 study by Clark looked at more 5,700 babies who had experienced homelessness. The study found that infants who are homeless had higher rates of low birth weight, chronic health issues, and fevers. Infants experiencing homelessness had more emergency room visits and increased risks of asthma through age six.

=== Mother's health ===
Just as children who come from homeless families are at a higher risk of developing behavioral, mental, and physical health problems than their peers, their mothers are also at a higher risk especially in developing mental illnesses. There are many things that contribute to why homeless women are at a higher rate of developing a mental illness compared to the general population, but there has been a reoccurring theme among studies focused on this issue.

=== Mental health ===
In 2006, homeless individuals reported mental illness as being the number three reason for becoming or staying homeless. Such illnesses are often closely linked with the fourth reason—substance use—and therefore it is generally accepted that both of these issues should be treated simultaneously. Although many medical, psychiatric, and counseling services exist to address these needs, it is commonly believed that without the support of reliable and stable housing, such treatments remain ineffective. In the absence of a universal healthcare plan, many of those in need cannot afford such services.

A 2020 representative sample of homeless youth across multiple US cities found that, in each city, more than 80% of the sampled individuals met criteria for at least one psychiatric diagnosis. A 2020 Epidemiological study found that only about 25–30% of homeless persons have a severe mental illness such as schizophrenia. Early studies, comparing homeless persons found that depression and suicidal thoughts were very prevalent, along with symptoms of trauma and substance abuse.

== Responses to homelessness ==
In 2004, the downtown partnership in Nashville, Tennessee, conducted a census on businesses. Sixty percent of respondents identified that public inebriates, transients and vagrants affect their employees, clients and customers. Businesses were solicited to identify issues that need to be addressed; transients and panhandlers ranked amongst the top five issues.

=== Audio deterrents ===
In 2019, two 7-Eleven locations — one in Sacramento, California, and one in Portland, Oregon — briefly employed a high-pitched noise maker to repel panhandlers and vagrants. In Portland, a local news source (750 KXL) described the sidewalk in front of the Downtown Portland 7-Eleven as being transformed from "barely walkable" to clean and orderly for the first time in years, after the repelling device was installed by the building's owner, Standard Insurance Company. The manager of the 7-Eleven told reporters he would see as many as a dozen transients simultaneously loitering in front of his store, and that this loitering adversely affected his business. The building's owner issued a statement that the goal was to protect the "safety of their employees, tenants, and guests in a location that has been consistently plagued by public drug use and menacing behavior."

In 2019, a manager for a 7-Eleven in Modesto, California, also attested to the effectiveness of sound for deterring undesirable activity, commenting that "Once the music started, the riffraff left."

=== Criminalization ===
As of 2011, there were laws that both directly and indirectly criminalized people that are homeless. As of 2012, some jurisdictions had made it illegal to attempt to feed homeless people outdoors. As of 2014, at least 31 cities have criminalized feeding people that are homeless.

In 2014, the United Nations Human Rights Committee criticized the United States for the criminalization of homelessness, noting that such "cruel, inhuman and degrading treatment" is in violation of international human rights treaty obligations. A 2018 report by Philip Alston, the U.N. Special Rapporteur on extreme poverty and human rights, found that homeless persons have effectively been criminalized in many cities around the United States, and noted that "punishing and imprisoning the poor is the distinctively American response to poverty in the twenty-first century." As of 2023, Missouri, Tennessee, and Texas have passed laws to ban homeless public camping by homeless people, often punishing such behavior with felony charges, with other states considering similar legislation.

==== Vagrancy ====
As of 2024, some municipalities in the US make it a crime to provide food or shelter to homeless people. Some local jurisdictions make it illegal for homeless people to sleep with blankets in parks and on public property. Other local jurisdictions have proposed banning the of soap in beachfront showers.

In August 2012, a federal district judge in Philadelphia ruled that laws prohibiting serving food to homeless people outdoors were unconstitutional.

In June 2014, the U.S. Court of Appeals for the Ninth Circuit struck down a 1983 ordinance in the city of Los Angeles which "bans people from living in cars or recreational vehicles on city streets or in parking lots" as being unconstitutionally vague, saying "This broad and cryptic statute criminalizes innocent behavior, making it impossible for citizens to know how to keep their conduct within the pale. ... Unlike other cities, which ban overnight parking or sleeping in vehicles, Los Angeles' law prohibits using cars as 'living quarters' both overnight and 'day-by-day, or otherwise'."

In 2015, homeless rights advocates were pushing for "Right to Rest" bills in several states, to overturn laws that target homeless people for sitting, eating, and sleeping in public places.

In 2018, in Martin v. Boise the Court of Appeals for the Ninth Circuit ruled that city ordinances banning sleeping outside cannot be enforced, if there are not enough shelter beds available in the city.

In 2024, in Grants Pass v. Johnson the US Supreme Court ruled that cities may criminalize homelessness, as homelessness constitutes conduct, not status, and that the precedent set in Robinson v. California does not apply.

In 2025, 59 percent of all available beds were in permanent housing programs, with 57 percent serving people in permanent supportive housing. Another 20 percent were in "other permanent housing" for those homeless at entry, and 23 percent were for people in rental housing through rapid rehousing assistance. The total number of year-round beds for homeless individuals and those in permanent housing has nearly doubled since 2007, increasing by 98 percent.

=== Crimes against homeless people ===
Since the 1990s, there has been a growing number of violent acts committed upon people experiencing homelessness. The rate of such documented crimes in 2005 was 30% higher than of those in 1999. Some teens engage in this activity as a source of amusement. CNN reported in 2007 that such incidents were on the rise.

In 2006, the Center for the Study of Hate & Extremism (CSHE) at California State University, San Bernardino in conjunction with the NCH found that 155 homeless people were killed by non-homeless people in "hate killings", while 76 people were killed in all the other traditional hate crime homicide categories, such as race and religion, combined.

Studies and surveys indicate that homeless people have a much higher criminal victimization rate than the non-homeless, but that most incidents never get reported to authorities. A 2007 study found that the number of violent crimes against homeless people is increasing. In 2013, there were 109 attacks on homeless people, a 24 percent increase on the previous year, according to the NCH. Eighteen people died as a result of the attacks. In July 2014, three boys 15, 16 and 18, were arrested and charged with beating to death two homeless men with bricks and a metal pole in Albuquerque, New Mexico.

As in other countries, criminals—both individuals and organized groups—sometimes exploit homeless people, ranging from identity theft to tax and welfare scams. Homeless people, and homeless organizations, are also known to be accused or convicted of frauds and scams. These incidents often lead to negative impressions of homeless people by the general public.

=== Advocacy efforts ===
Homeless advocates' importance has been critical in producing humanizing narratives that challenge a traditional media representation of the homeless population. The surge of homeless advocates played a key role in forming the growing Housing First approach. Some scholars attribute the advocacy of J. Edward Guinan, who was later joined by Mitch Snyder, two of countless homeless advocates of the 80s, to meaningful federal change in approaches to homelessness during the Reagan era. This includes critical legislation for funding and coordinating aid for people experiencing homelessness, such as the formation of the Low-Income Housing Tax Credit program and the Stewart B. McKinney Homelessness Assistance Act, also known as the McKinney-Vento Homelessness Assistance Act. There is discourse that emphasizes the importance of creating policy solutions developed with and supported by individuals experiencing homelessness.

=== Efforts towards ending homelessness ===
According to the Housing First model, what homeless people need more than anything else is affordable housing.

==== Housing ====
In 2006, homeless individuals reported a lack of affordable housing as the number one reason for becoming homeless.

The two main types of housing programs provided for homeless people are transitional and permanent housing. Transitional housing programs are operated with one goal in mind—to help individuals and families obtain permanent housing as quickly as possible. Transitional housing programs assist homeless for a fixed amount of time, or until they are able to obtain housing on their own and function successfully in the community, or whichever comes first.

Barriers in tenant screening processes often prevent housing efforts. Some states have sealed eviction records to make it easier for tenants to become rehoused. Advocates have also campaigned for tenant right to counsel programs that provide free legal counsel to tenants facing an eviction. The goal of these programs is to prevent evictions and public eviction records.

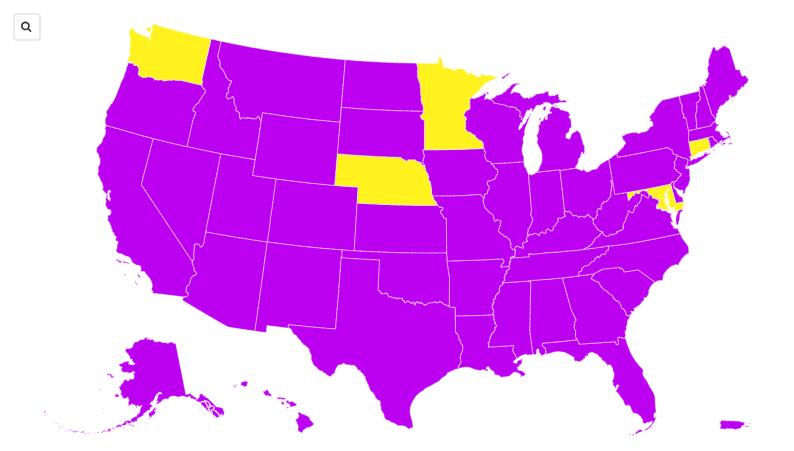
US state legislation on tenant right to counsel (NOTE: does not indicate cities with tenant right to counsel) No statewide TRTC Some statewide TRTC passed

Some shelters and associated charitable foundations have bought buildings and real estate to develop into permanent housing for homeless people in lieu of transitional Housing.

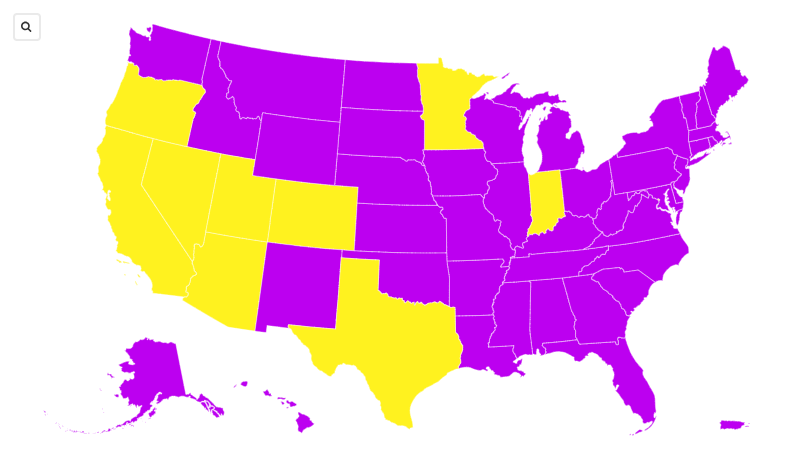
US state legislation on eviction sealing (NOTE: does not indicate cities with eviction sealing) No statewide eviction sealing Some statewide eviction sealing passed

The United States Department of Housing and Urban Development and Veterans Administration have a special Section 8 housing voucher program called VASH (Veterans Administration Supported Housing), or HUD-VASH, which gives out a certain number of Section 8 subsidized housing vouchers to eligible homeless and otherwise vulnerable US armed forces veterans. The HUD-VASH program has been successful in housing many homeless veterans.

In 2018, the number of U.S. citizens residing in their vehicles because they cannot find affordable housing has "exploded", particularly in cities with steep increases in the cost of living such as Seattle, Los Angeles, Portland, and San Francisco. Bloomberg reported in November 2018 that the wealthiest cities in the U.S., in particular those in the Western states, are experiencing a homelessness crisis driven largely by stagnant wages and "skyrocketing rents".

In 2019, Google pledged one billion USD into funding 20,000 homes over the next decade throughout the San Francisco Bay Area. The Bay Area is booming with economically successful people, who end up driving up the price of housing and increases the divide between the people who need the housing and the new houses being built. In particular, the metropolitan area of San Francisco has some of the most expensive real estate in the United States.

===== Housing First =====
Housing First is an evidence based approach, that recognizes housing as one of the most impactful social determinants of health that affect those experiencing homelessness. Housing First has been met with success since its initial implementations in 2009, by providing relatively no strings-attached housing to homeless people with substance use disorder problems or mental health issues. Housing First allows homeless men and women to be taken directly off the street into private community-based apartments, without requiring treatment first. This allows homeless people to return to some sense of normalcy, from which it is believed that they are better-poised to tackle their addictions or sicknesses. The relapse rate through these types of programs is lower than that of conventional homeless programs.

The BHH Collective is a program that has implemented the Housing First approach. It began in 2015 as an initiative in Chicago, Illinois, between BHH and University of Illinois Hospital to provide for frequently homeless emergency department patients. The housing was paid for by the hospital and federal housing subsidies. The program provides the individuals with case managers, specialized health services based on the individual's needs, and other services they need. BHH Collective aims to address the connection between housing and health by providing supportive housing to homeless individuals in order to improve the health of homeless people and address homelessness at the same time.

===== Other transitional housing interventions =====
Studies have been conducted to demonstrate the ability of homeless people to receive and maintain houses and jobs when provided with adequate support. In LA's Homeless Opportunity Providing Employment (HOPE), for homeless adults with mental illness, individual characteristics in regards to specific mental illness or substance abuse played little role in the systemic difference to the employment outcomes. However, these factors including race and ethnicity, affected individual housing outcomes.

The provision of housing for homeless people reduces healthcare costs, inpatient hospitalizations, and emergency room costs. When provided with supportive housing, many homeless people are eligible for healthcare coverage. People with housing are less likely to need health services, as a stable home provides protection from the elements, prevention from sicknesses, wounds and infections, and a generally safer environment than the streets. This is what Rapid Rehousing programs (RRHP) support. Designed to aid families experiencing homelessness, RRHP provides access to private affordable housing markets for a better transition back into stable housing. The three major parts necessary for the program's success are: finding landlords and appropriate housing, providing move-in assistance; providing case management and support services to ensure the prolonged and eventual permanent rehousing success of each family.

In the early 2000s, the provision of housing for homeless persons was contingent on their treatment and abstinence from addictive substances. However, emerging Permanent supportive housing approaches reversed the requirements, and provided homeless people housing without evidence of treatment for mental illness or substance abuse. These interventions are usually paired with case managers. With the inclusion of income assistance programs, there is a significant increase in number of days spent stably housed for participating individuals.

Other interventions include supportive services which come in various forms that can be done independently or paired with housing such as critical time intervention, housing vouchers, residential treatment, high-intensity case management, and combinations of the aforementioned. These have been found to be effective in reducing homelessness and, when paired with housing, increasing housing stability, especially any form of participation in case management is generally equally effective.

===== Permanent supportive housing =====
Permanent supportive housing (PSH) is an intervention that provides housing that does not limit residents' stays, along with supportive services that residents can opt into. PSH programs typically prioritize chronic homelessness, but can address other subpopulations of the homeless population. It is argued that PSH in particular will complement and alleviate the stress of the mainstream welfare system and short-term housing solutions such as shelters, while reducing costs in addressing homelessness.

There is ongoing discourse on how to make PSH the most effective, these considerations include assessing the housing, the supportive services, and the intensity of the resources available. Assessing these factors has been challenging since these housing models are typically fragmented. The effectiveness of PSH programs is considered to be reliant on the quality and location of the housing. Some benefits found from PSH include eliminating numerous potential health risks through reducing environmental risks and external stressors.

==== Federal and presidential efforts ====
In 2001, President Bush made ending chronic homelessness by 2012 as part of his Compassion Agenda, as his campaign promised to fully fund the McKinney Act. The bi-partisan, congressionally mandated, Millennial Housing Commission included ending chronic homelessness in 10 years, among its principal recommendations in its Report to Congress in 2002. By 2003, the Interagency Council on Homelessness had been re-engaged and charged with pursuing the President's 10-year plan.

In October 2003, the Administration announced the award of over $48 million in grants aimed at serving the needs of the chronically homeless, through two initiatives. The "Ending Chronic Homelessness through Employment and Housing" initiative was a collaborative grant offered jointly by HUD and the Department of Labor (DOL). With the focus on providing housing and employment for the homeless population, there was not much attention placed on their comprehensive health. Addressing homeless health is difficult in a traditional healthcare setting, due to the complex nature of the needs of homeless people and the multitude of health consequences they face. In 2003–04, during the 108th United States Congress meeting, the proposed Bringing America Home Act was intended to provide comprehensive treatment for many homeless mental and substance use disorder patients - it has not been passed or funded.

In 2010, under President Obama's administration, a federal strategic plan to end homelessness was released. This plan created four key goals: Prevent and end homelessness among Veterans in 5 years; Finish the job of ending chronic homelessness in 7 years; Prevent and end homelessness for families, youth, and children in 10 years; Set a path to ending all types of homelessness. Capitalizing on these insights, the Plan built on previous reforms and the intent by the Obama Administration to directly address homelessness through intergovernmental cooperation for rehabilitating the homeless population and preventing homelessness to those at high-risk. In 2015, First Lady Michelle Obama called for the collaboration of mayors, governors, and county officials to commit to ending Veteran homelessness in their communities, and reached out to additional mayors and local leaders to participate.

===== The McKinney–Vento Homeless Assistance Act =====
Homelessness has a tremendous effect on a child's education. Education of homeless youth is thought to be essential in breaking the cycle of poverty. The 1987 McKinney–Vento Homeless Assistance Act mandates equal opportunity to a free public education to homeless students. This act is supposed to break down the barriers homeless students have to receiving an education. These barriers include residency restriction, medical record verification, and transportation issues.

Once a student surpasses these barriers, they are still subject to the stigma of being homeless, and the humiliation they feel because of their situation. Some families do not report their homelessness, while others are unaware of the opportunities available to them. Many report that maintaining a stable school environment helps the students because it is the only thing that remains normal. Many homeless students fall behind their peers in school due to behavioral disorders, and lack of attendance in school.

Since the United States housing bubble collapse, there has been a rise in the number of homeless students. In December 2008, NAEHCY or the National Association for the Education of Homeless for Children and Youth, reported a 99% increase in homeless students within a three-month period in San Diego.

Of 1,636 schools in December 2008, 330 reported no increase in student homelessness, 847 reported an increase of half, and 459 reported an increase of 25 percent or more. Due to underfunding, many school districts struggled to provide the necessary services to support homeless students, as mandated in the provisions of the McKinney–Vento Act, such as rising transportation needs and the greater range and usefulness of services. Wisconsin Rapids Public Schools Homeless Liaison Heather Lisitza says:

One of the biggest challenges our district faces is providing transportation to students who are experiencing homelessness. There are few approaches that our district can utilize to provide transportation for these students. Our city has only one taxi cab service and no public bus system. Our cab company is small and simply cannot fulfill all of our transportation requests. When it's possible, we add students to existing bus routes or set up a contractual agreement with the student's parent/guardian. However, there have been many situations where none of these options have worked. Another challenge our district faces is providing proper outer-wear for students who are homeless. Being that we live in central Wisconsin and have long, cold winters, all students need proper outerwear to go outside. Proper outerwear includes snow boots, hat, mittens, snow pants, and a winter jacket that has a working zipper or buttons on it. This expense adds up quickly and is hard to provide to the increasing number of homeless students.

This is especially worrisome since homeless students are 1) 1.5 times more likely to perform below grade level in reading; 2) 1.5 times more likely to perform below grade level in spelling; and 3) 2.5 times more likely to perform below grade level in math. There are a few worries that there will be false reports of homeless students, but mostly it is not an issue.

The United States Interagency Council on Homelessness (USICH) was established in 1987 through the McKinney-Vento Assistance Act. It was in operation from 1987 to 1994 and was reinstated in 2001 to 2028. The USICH is an executive branch responsible for collaborating with government agencies to assess targeted programs, or also known as programs geared towards assisting persons experiencing homelessness. The targeted programs address the impacts of homelessness on individuals, spanning from various federal agencies such as the Housing and Urban Development (HUD), the Department of Veterans Affairs (VA), and the Department of Health and Human Services (HHS). The Chronic Homelessness Initiative, one of the projects USICH has led, was a ten-year plan to ending chronic homelessness begun in 2002 through housing programs such as low-threshold and permanent supportive housing.

==== Discourse ====
There has been robust discourse discussing whose responsibility it is to end homelessness; some actors argued to be responsible include individuals, local governments, state governments, and the federal government. Scholars debate what solutions should be used to end homelessness. Recommendations include assessing the current homelessness relief system and alternative ways to rearrange the system so that solutions, such as permanent supportive housing and residential transitional programming, target the most impacted groups of individuals experiencing homelessness and are provided for an appropriate period.

Some scholars call for the federal government to broaden its tolerance for solutions to homelessness beyond just permanently subsidized housing. Arguments made recognize that the shift to Housing First has reduced the punishing tactics while failing to include the diverse homeless population's needs and demand that solutions are more compassionate, inclusive, and efficient than the current system. Other critiques of the current homelessness relief system include mismatches in timeliness, quantity, and quality of needs and available resources.

== Public libraries ==
In May 1991, Richard Kreimer, a homeless man in Morristown, N.J. sued the local public library and the Town of Morristown for expelling him from the library, after other patrons complained about his disruptive behavior and pungent body odor. He later won the case and settled for $250,000.

Public libraries can and often do significantly assist with the issues presented by homelessness. In many communities, the library is the only facility that offers free computer and internet access. This is where many people experiencing homelessness go to locate services for basic needs, such as healthcare, education, and housing. Library computers are necessary for building a resume, searching for open jobs in the area, and completing job applications.

A 2010 article and video entitled, "SF library offers Social Services to Homeless," speaks about the San Francisco library having a full-time social worker at the library to reduce and help homeless patrons. It mentions that Leah Esguerra, who is a psychiatric social worker, has a usual routine making her rounds to different homeless patrons, and greeting them to see if she could help them. She offers help in different forms that could range from linking patrons with services, or providing them with mental health counseling. She supervises a 12-week vocational program that culminates in gainful employment in the library for the formerly homeless.

The San Jose University Library became one of the first academic libraries to pay attention to the needs of homeless people and implement changes to better serve this population. In 2007, the merged University Library and Public Library made the choice to be proactive in reaching out. Collaborations with non-profit organizations in the area culminated in computer classes being taught, as well as nutrition classes, family literacy programs, and book discussion groups. After eighteen months, the library staff felt they still were not doing enough and "analyzed program participation trends supplemented by observation and anecdotes" in order to better understand the information needs of homeless people. When it was understood that these needs are complex, additional customer service training was provided to all staff who were interested.

Once the staff more fully understood the needs of homeless people, it was determined that many programs in place already, with a few minor adjustments, would be helpful to homeless people. For example, the providing book clubs have proven to be very effective bridges between librarians and homeless people. Programs were tailored to meet these needs. Additional changes implemented included temporary computer passes and a generous in-house reading space to counteract the policies in place that may prevent a homeless person from obtaining a library card.

The Dallas Public Library started "Coffee and Conversation" which is part of their Homeless Engagement Initiative. The staff hopes these bimonthly events between staff and homeless patrons will help them better serve the homeless people population in Dallas. They sponsor Street View podcast, a library produced podcast featuring the stories and experiences of the city's homeless population. Guests often include social service providers.

== Situations in cities and states ==
As of 2023, the issue of homelessness in the US is severe, with states like California, New York, Florida, Texas, and Washington having a combined number of over 330,000 homeless people. In 2023, California alone had over 161,000. Although begging and panhandling are among the ways homeless people can obtain money, in Kansas, Mississippi, and Maryland, begging and panhandling are considered crimes. In June 2024, a U.S. Supreme Court 6-3 ruling, permitted cities to enforce bans on homeless people sleeping in public places.

California has been identified as especially vulnerable to homelessness due to high housing costs that are unaffordable and a lack of shelters, which have left a large portion of the population unsheltered. Homelessness in California is especially prevalent due to the growing demand for housing, while the production of new housing has been well below the national average. Homelessness in California is disproportionately concentrated in select cities such as San Francisco and Los Angeles. Some scholars emphasize that this is not an issue that select cities are solely responsible for, nor do they have the capacity to solve. They claim the federal government has failed to take a meaningful role in alleviating homelessness.

== Public attitudes ==
Many advocates for homeless people contend that a key difficulty is the social stigma surrounding homelessness. Many associate a lack of a permanent home with a lack of a proper bathroom and limited access to regular grooming. Thus, people that are homeless become "aesthetically unappealing" to the general public. Research shows that "physically attractive persons are judged more positively than physically unattractive individuals on various traits... reflecting social competence."

In addition to the physical component of stigmatization exists an association of homeless people with mental illness. Many people consider the mentally ill to be irresponsible and childlike and treat them with fear and exclusion, using their mental incapacitation as justification for why they should be left out of communities.

A common misconception persists that many individuals who panhandle are not actually homeless, but actually use pity and compassion to fund their lifestyles, making up to $20 an hour and living luxurious lives. This exception to the rule seems more prevalent due to media attention, but in reality, only a few cases exist.

Public opinion surveys show relatively little support for this view. A 1995 paper in the American Journal of Community Psychology concluded that "although the homeless are clearly stigmatized, there is little evidence to suggest that the public has lost compassion and is unwilling to support policies to help homeless people." A Penn State study in 2004 concluded that "familiarity breeds sympathy" and greater support for addressing the problem.

A 2007 survey conducted by Public Agenda, a non-profit organization that helps leaders and their citizens navigate through complex social issues, found that 67 percent of New Yorkers agreed that most homeless people were without shelter because of "circumstances beyond their control", including high housing costs and lack of good and steady employment. More than one-third (36 percent) said they worried about becoming homeless themselves, with 15 percent saying they were "very worried." 90 percent of New Yorkers believed that everyone has a right to shelter, and 68 percent believed that the government is responsible for guaranteeing that right to its citizens. The survey found support for investments in prevention, rental assistance and permanent housing for homeless people.

Research by Public Agenda concluded that the public's sympathy has limits. In a 2002 national survey, the organization found 74 percent say the police should leave a homeless person alone if they are not bothering anyone. In contrast, 71 percent say the police should move homeless people if they are keeping customers away from a shopping area. 51 percent say homeless people should be moved if they are driving other people away from a public park.

A 2005 book by Anthony Marcus, argued that homelessness as a political concern in the 1980s and 90s was constructed around Democratic Party regional and national opposition to austerity politics during the Reagan Revolution 1981-1993. Appearing primarily in states and municipalities like Massachusetts, California, New York City, Santa Monica, and San Francisco where strong social welfare support and powerful liberal Democratic Party political machines held sway, the politics of homelessness became a battle standard in the anti-Reagan resistance, creating widespread concern for "the homeless" in the absence of significant concern or support for overall "social housing". According to Marcus, nearly immediately after the 1992 election of Democratic candidate Bill Clinton to the Presidency, concern for "homelessness" melted away across the United States, regardless of regional and municipal social welfare situations and housing environments.

== Statistics and demographics ==
Completely accurate and comprehensive statistics are difficult to acquire for any social study, but especially so when measuring the ambiguous hidden, and erratic reality of homelessness. All figures given are estimates. These estimates represent overall national averages. The proportions of specific homeless communities can vary substantially depending on local geography.

=== Annual Homeless Assessment Report to Congress ===
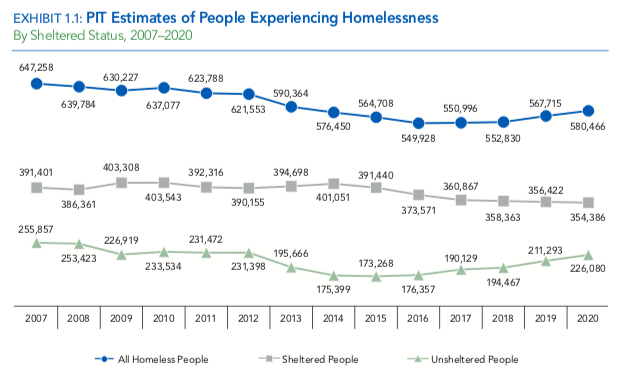
US yearly timeline of people experiencing homelessness, 2007-2020.

Perhaps the most accurate, comprehensive, and current data on homelessness in the United States is reported annually by the Department of Housing and Urban Development (HUD) in the Annual Homeless Assessment Report to Congress (AHAR), released every year since 2007. The AHAR report relies on data from two sources: single-night, point-in-time counts of both sheltered and unsheltered homeless populations reported on the Continuum of Care applications to HUD; and counts of the sheltered homeless population over a full year provided by a sample of communities based on data in their Management Information Systems (HMIS).

=== Other statistics ===
==== Total number ====
Over the course of the year (October 2009 – September 2010), the 2010 Annual Homeless Assessment Report found that 1,593,150 individuals experienced homelessness. Most were homeless temporarily. The chronically homeless population, those with repeated episodes or who have been homeless for long periods, decreased from 175,914 in 2005 to 123,833 in 2007. In the 2017 AHAR (Annual Homeless Assessment Report) about 553,742 people experienced homelessness, which was a 1% increase from 2016. An April 2022 YouGov survey found that 19 percent of Americans reported having ever been homeless, while a December 2023 survey found that 17 percent of Americans reported having been homeless at one point in their lives.

==== Familial composition ====
In the 2010 NCHWIH report:

- 51.3% are single males.
- 24.7% are single females.
- 23% are families with children—the fastest growing segment.
- 5% are minors unaccompanied by adults.
- 39% of the total homeless population are children under the age of 18.

==== Marital status ====
In the 2014 NCHWIH report:

- 24% are married.
- 76% are single.
- 67.5% are single males within the single percentage.
- 32.5% are single females within the single percentage.

==== Race and ethnicity ====
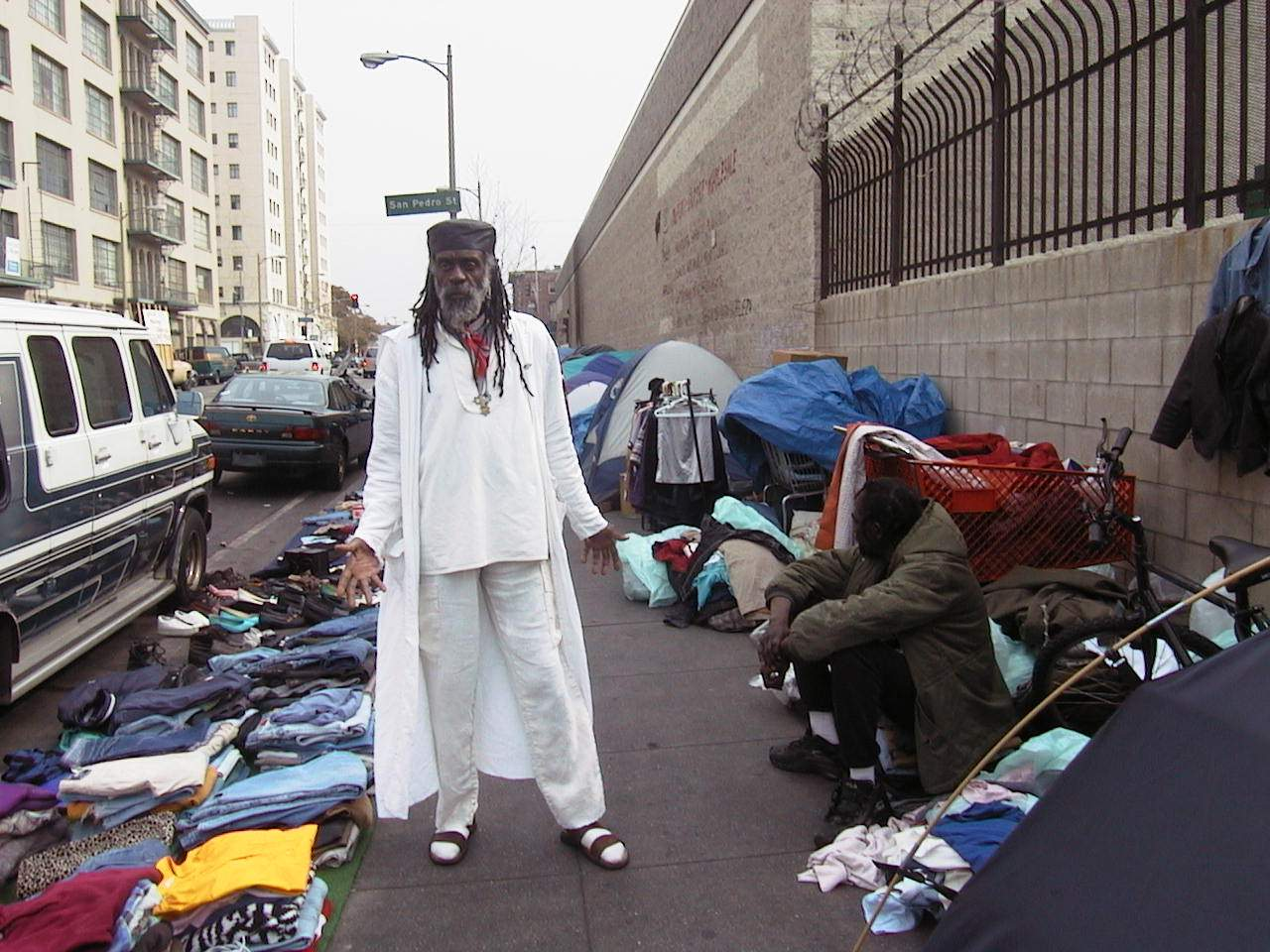
The homeless tent city in Skid Row, Los Angeles. The 2019 count found 58,936 homeless people living in Los Angeles County.

In the 2010 SAMHSA report, among all sheltered individuals over the course of a year (October 2009-September 2010): Gender, Age, Race/Ethnicity

- 41.6% are White, Non-Hispanic
- 9.7% are White, Hispanic
- 37% are Black/African-American
- 4.5% are other single races;
- 7.2% are multiple races

In the 2014 NCHWIH report:

- 42% are African American (over-represented 3.23× compared to 13% of general population).
- 38% are Caucasian (under-represented 0.53× compared to 72% of general population).
- 20% are Hispanic (over-represented 1.25× compared to 16% of general population).
- 4% are Native American (over-represented 4× compared to 1% of general population).
- 2% are Asian-American (under-represented 0.4× compared to 5% of general population).

==== Mental health ====
In the 2010 SAMHSA report:

- 26.2% of all sheltered persons who were homeless had a severe mental illness
- About 30% of people who are chronically homeless have mental health conditions.

In analyses of data from the 1996 NSHAPCxiv:

- Over 60% of people who are chronically homeless have experienced lifetime mental health problems

==== Substance use ====
In the 2010 SAMHSA report:

- 34.7% of all sheltered adults who were homeless had chronic substance use issues
- About 50% of people who are chronically homeless had co-occurring substance use problems.

In analyses of data from the 1996 NSHAPCxiv:

- Over 80% have experienced lifetime alcohol and/or drug problems

==== Education ====
According to the 1996 Urban Institute findings of the National Survey of Homeless Assistance Providers and Clients (UIHAC) report

- 53% have less than a high school education
- 21% have completed high school
- 27% have some education beyond high school.

==== Employment ====
In the 1996 UIHAC report:

- 44 percent did paid work during the past month. Of these:
- 20 percent worked in a job lasting or expected to last at least three months.
- 25 percent worked at a temporary or day labor job.
- 2 percent earned money by peddling or selling personal belongings.

A 2010 longitudinal study of homeless men conducted in Birmingham, Alabama, found that most earned an average of ninety dollars per week, while working an average of thirty hours per week

==== Location ====
In the 2010 SAMHSA report:

- 71% reside in central cities.
- 21% are in suburbs.
- 9% are in rural areas.

In 2019, the U.S. Department of Housing and Urban Development reported:

- 78,676 homeless in New York City
- 75,000 homeless in Los Angeles
- 12,112 homeless in Seattle

==== Duration ====
In the 2010 SAMHSA report, research on shelter use in New York City and Philadelphia concluded that:

- People experiencing transitional homelessness constitute 80% of shelter users
- People experiencing episodic homelessness comprise 10% of shelter users.

In New York City

- Transitionally homeless individuals experience an average of 1.4 stays over a 3-year period, for a total of 58 days on average over the 3 years.
- Episodically homeless individuals, on average, experience 4.9 shelter episodes over a 3-year period totaling 264 days with an average length of stay of 54.4 days.

Data from the 1996 NSHAPC, show that about 50% of people who were homeless were experiencing their first or second episode of homelessness, which typically lasted a few weeks or months to one year.

==== Gender ====
In the 2017 Annual Homelessness Assessment Report:

- 60.5% are male.
- 39% are female.
- 0.4% are transgender
- 0.2% do not identify as male, female, or transgender.

==== Age ====
In the 2017 Annual Homelessness Assessment Report:

- 20.7% are under 18.
- 9.7% are 18–24.
- 69.6% are over 24.

== See also ==
- Housing insecurity in the United States
- Poverty in the United States
- History of poverty in the United States
- Tramp

== Bibliography and further reading ==
- Aguirre, Adalberto; Brooks, Jonathan. (2001), "City redevelopment policies and the criminalization of homelessness: A narrative case study", in Kevin Fox Gotham (ed.) Critical Perspectives on Urban Redevelopment (Research in Urban Sociology, Volume 6), Emerald Group Publishing Limited, pp. 75–105
- American Library Association, Social Responsibilities Round Table, Hunger, Homelessness & Poverty Task Force. (n.d.). Resources. Retrieved December 13, 2010.
- Barry, Ellen, "A Refugee's Triumph Over Desolation". The Boston Globe, December 28, 2003.
- Baumohl, Jim, (editor), Homelessness in America, Oryx Press, Phoenix, 1996. ISBN 0-89774-869-7.
- Bley, D. (January 19, 2011). "Raising the Visibility of Family Homelessness in Washington State".
- Booth, Brenda M., Sullivan, J. Greer, Koegel, Paul, Burnam, M. Audrey, "Vulnerability Factors for Homelessness Associated with Substance Dependence in a Community Sample of Homeless Adults". RAND Research Report. Originally published in: American Journal of Drug and Alcohol Abuse, v. 28, no. 3, 2002, pp. 429–452.
- Borchard, Kurt, Homeless in Las Vegas: Stories from the Street, University of Nevada Press, 2011
- Borchard, Kurt, The Word on the Street: Homeless Men in Las Vegas, University of Nevada Press, 2005
- Burke, Kerry, Fox, Alison, Martinez, Jose, "Hobo Madness hits Mad. Ave.: Bizman Sues Homeless for $", New York Daily News, January 18, 2007.
- Center for Social Policy, University of Massachusetts Boston, "Hard Numbers, Hard Times: Homeless Individuals in Massachusetts Emergency Shelters 1999–2003", July 2004.
- Coalition for the Homeless (New York), "A History of Modern Homelessness in New York City".
- Colburn, Gregg; Aldern, Clayton Page (2022). Homelessness Is a Housing Problem: How Structural Factors Explain U.S. Patterns. Oakland, CA: University of California Press. ISBN 978-0-520-38376-0.
- Crimaldi, Laura, "Cardinal spends time with homeless", Boston Herald, December 26, 2006.
- Crimaldi, Laura, "Homeless Advocates Urge no Diversion of Shelter Funds", Boston Herald, Wednesday, February 14, 2007.
- Crimaldi, Laura, "Champion for homeless fights for life", Boston Herald, Sunday, September 21, 2008. About Richard Weintraub, Director of Homeless Services for Boston, Massachusetts. The article has some modern history of homelessness in Boston.
- Crouse, Joan M. The Homeless Transient in the Great Depression: New York State, 1929–1941 (1986). online
- CSPTech, University of Massachusetts, Boston, "Characteristics of Homeless Families Accessing Massachusetts Emergency Shelters 1999–2001", April 2003.
- Culhane, Dennis, "Responding to Homelessness: Policies and Politics", 2001.
- deMause, Neil, "Out of the Shelter, Into the Fire: New city program for homeless: Keep your job or keep your apartment", The Village Voice, New York, June 20, 2006.
- DePastino, Todd. Citizen Hobo: How a Century of Homelessness Shaped America (2003). ISBN 0-226-14378-3
- Desjarlais, Robert R., Shelter blues: sanity and selfhood among the homeless, (U of Pennsylvania Press, 1997) on homeless people in the Boston area.
- Dreier, Peter; Appelbaum, Richard, "American Nightmare: Homelessness", Challenge: The Magazine of Economic Affairs, v.34, n.2, March/April 1991, pp. 46–52.
- Eide, Stephen. Homelessness in America: The history and tragedy of an intractable social problem (Bloomsbury, 2022), A standard scholarly history online
- Eide, Stephen. "Housing first and homelessness: the rhetoric and the reality." (Manhattan Institute, 2020). online
- Flowers, R. Barri (2010). Street Kids: the Lives of Runaway and Thrownaway Teens. Jefferson, NC: McFarland. ISBN 978-0-7864-5663-5.
- Freeman, Richard B.; Hall, Brian, "PERMANENT HOMELESSNESS IN AMERICA?", Working Paper No. 2013, National Bureau of Economic Research, Cambridge, Massachusetts, September 1986
- Friedman, Donna Haig, et al., "Preventing Homelessness and Promoting Housing Stability : A Comparative Analysis", The Boston Foundation and UMASS/Boston Center for Social Policy, June 2007.
- Gatto, Nora, "Vincent", Niagara University, Eagle Alumni Magazine, Fall 2006, p. 12.
- Goldstone, Brian. There Is No Place for Us: Working and Homeless in America. New York: Crown, 2025. ISBN 978-0593237144
- Haymes, Stephen, et al. eds. The Routledge Handbook of Poverty in the United States. (2015). online
- Hoch, Charles; Slayton, Robert A., New Homeless and Old: Community and the Skid Row Hotel, (Temple UP, 1989). ISBN 0-87722-600-8
- My so-called emancipation from foster care to homelessness for California youth (PDF) (Report). Human Rights Watch. 2010.
- Kadi, J.; Ronald, R. (2016). "Undermining housing affordability for New York's low-income households: The role of policy reform and rental sector restructuring" (PDF). Critical Social Policy. 36 (2): 265–266. doi:10.1177/0261018315624172. hdl:11245.1/19c94383-fa06-4264-912b-240212d979e6. S2CID 155880344.
- Katz, Celeste (March 13, 2012). "Public Advocate Bill de Blasio To BBH Global: Keep Your "Homeless Hotspot" Stunt Out Of NYC". The New York Daily News.
- Katz, Jessica Ilana, "Homelessness, Crime, Mental Illness, and Substance Abuse: A Core Population with Multiple Social Service Needs", Department of Urban Planning and Studies, Massachusetts Institute of Technology, June 2003
- Keen, J. (December 13, 2010). Libraries welcome homeless to 'community living rooms.' USA Today Retrieved December 13, 2010
- Knight, H. (January 11, 2010). Library adds social worker to assist homeless. San Francisco Chronicle. Retrieved from sfgate.com
- Koebel, C. Theodore (1998). Shelter and Society: Theory, Research, and Policy for Nonprofit Housing. SUNY Press. ISBN 978-0-7914-3789-6.
- Kuhlman, Thomas L., Psychology on the streets : mental health practice with homeless persons, New York : J. Wiley & Sons, 1994. ISBN 0-471-55243-7
- Kusmer, Kenneth L., "Down and Out, On the Road: The Homeless in American History", Oxford University Press, 2003. ISBN 0-19-504778-8 online
- Leeder, K. (December 1, 2010). Welcoming the Homeless into Libraries. In the Library with the Lead Pipe. Retrieved from Welcoming the Homeless into Libraries – In the Library with the Lead Pipe
- Levinson, David, ed. (2004). Encyclopedia of Homelessness. Thousand Oaks, California: Sage Publications. ISBN 978-0-7619-2751-8.
- Lowe, Eugene T. (December 13, 2016). The U.S. Conference of Mayors' Report on Hunger and Homelessness: A Status Report on Homelessness and Hunger in America's Cities (Report). Washington, DC: U.S. Conference of Mayors.
- Lucas, David S., and Christopher J. Boudreaux. "When “what works” does not work: The United States’ mission to end homelessness." Moonshots and the New Industrial Policy: Questioning the Mission Economy (2024): 145-168. online; new policies in 21st century failed to end or much reduce it.
- Maharidge, Dale. "How the United States Chose to Become a Country of Homelessness." The Nation.
- Markee, Patrick (2025). Placeless: Homelessness in the New Gilded Age (First hardcover ed.). Brooklyn, NY: Melville House Publishing. ISBN 9781685891671. OCLC 1482059889.
- Massachusetts, Commonwealth of, "Housing the Homeless: a more effective approach", Governor's Executive Commission for Homeless Services Coordination, November 2003.
- Massachusetts Coalition for the Homeless, "Down & Out Resource Manual", 2005.
- The Massachusetts Commission to End Homelessness, "Report of the Special Commission Relative to Ending Homelessness in the Commonwealth", Boston, Massachusetts, December 28, 2007 (January 2008).
- Morton, Margaret, The Tunnel: The Underground Homeless of New York City, Yale University Press, 1995. ISBN 0-300-06559-0.
- National Coalition for the Homeless, "American Nightmare: A Decade of Homelessness in the United States", December 1989
- National Coalition for the Homeless. (July 2009) "Homes Not Handcuffs: The Criminalization of Homelessness in U.S. Cities". Retrieved December 13, 2010,.
- National Coalition for the Homeless and The National Law Center on Homelessness & Poverty (January 9, 2006), A Dream Denied: The Criminalization of Homelessness in U.S. Cities (PDF), Washington, DC: Authors, archived from the original (PDF) on October 27, 2019
- Nieto G., Gittelman M., Abad A. (2008). "Homeless Mentally Ill Persons: A bibliography review", International Journal of Psychosocial Rehabilitation. 12(2)
- O'Flaherty, Brendan, "Making room : the economics of homelessness", Cambridge, Massachusetts : Harvard University Press, 1996. ISBN 0-674-54342-4
- Quigley, John M.; Raphael, Steven, "The Economics of Homelessness: The Evidence from North America", European Journal of Housing Policy 1(3), 2001, 323–336
- Radin, Charles A., "On the street, a quiet outreach of kindness: Little Brothers lift the less fortunate", Boston Globe, December 18, 2006.
- Riis, Jacob, How the Other Half Lives, 1890.
- Rossi, Peter H., Down and Out in America: The Origins of Homelessness, University of Chicago Press, 1991.
- Russell, Jenna, "In their shoes: To better understand the plight of the homeless, Harvard student takes to the streets", Boston Globe, August 9, 2009
- Ryan, Charles V., "Homes Within Reach: Springfield's 10-year plan to end long term homelessness", City of Springfield, Massachusetts, Mayor Charles V. Ryan, January 2007.
- Sanburn, Josh., Bans Around U.S. Face Challenges in Court, October 10, 2013.
- Schneider, P. (November 17, 2010). Can remodeled library attract public, suit homeless? The Cap Times. Retrieved from Can remodeled library attract public, suit homeless?
- Schutt, Russell K., PhD, Professor, University of Massachusetts Boston.
  - Schutt, Russell K., et al., "Boston's Homeless, 1986–1987: Change and Continuity", 1987.
  - Schutt, Russell K., Working with the Homeless: the Backgrounds, Activities and Beliefs of Shelter Staff, 1988.
  - Schutt, Russell, K., "Homeless Adults in Boston in 1990: A Two-Shelter Profile", 1990.
  - Schutt, Russell K., Garrett, Gerald R., "Responding to the Homeless: Policy and Practice", Topics in Social Psychiatry, 1992. ISBN 0-306-44076-8
  - Schutt, Russell K., Byrne, Francine, et al., "City of Boston Homeless Services: Employment & Training for Homeless Persons", 1995.
  - Schutt, Russell K., Feldman, James, et al., "Homeless Persons' Residential Preferences and Needs: A Pilot Survey of Persons with Severe Mental Illness in Boston Mental Health and Generic Shelters", 2004.
- Sommer, Heidi, "Homelessness in Urban America: a Review of the Literature", 2001
- St. Mungo's organisation (UK), "A Brief History of Homelessness"
- Stern, H. (1992). "Aimless and homeless, he wins fortune in court lawsuit: Library who banned him, police who harassed him, wish they hadn't—to the tune of $250,000". Los Angeles Times Retrieved November 18, 2010.
- Stewart B. McKinney Act, 42 U.S.C. § 11301, et seq. (1994). Retrieved December 1, 2010.
- Stringer, Lee, Grand Central Winter: Stories from the Street, 1st ed., New York: Seven Stories Press, 1998. ISBN 1-888363-57-6
- Sylvestre, John, and Nick Kerman. "The evolution of housing first: Perspectives of experts from the United States, Canada, and Europe." European Journal of Homelessness 18.1 (2024): 137-162. online
- Szantos, Ruth (2010). Excuse Me: Can You Spare Some Change in This Economy: A Socio-Economic History of Anti-Panhandling Laws
- Toth, Jennifer, The Mole People: Life in the Tunnels Beneath New York City, 1993. ISBN 1-55652-190-1.
- United States Conference of Mayors, "Hunger and Homelessness Survey", December 2005.
- United States Department of Health and Human Services, "Ending Chronic Homelessness: Strategies for Action", Report from the Secretary's Work Group on Ending Chronic Homelessness, March 2003.
- University of Vermont, "It starts With a Bed: UVM alums Richard Weintraub & Lyndia Downie lead fight to break cycle of homelessness in Boston, Vermont Quarterly, Fall 2002.
- U.S. Department of Housing and Urban Development (2009). 2009 Annual homeless assessment report to congress. Washington, DC: U.S. Government Printing Office.
- Vissing, Yvonne "Out of Sight, Out of Mind: Homeless Children and Families in Small-Town America";, 1996.
- Vissing, Yvonne, "The $ubtle War Against Children", Fellowship, March/April 2003
- Vladeck, Bruce, R., and the Committee on Health Care for Homeless People, Institute of Medicine, "Homelessness, Health, and Human needs", National Academies Press, 1988
- Wagner, David. Checkerboard Square: Culture and Resistance in a Homeless Community (Boulder: Westview Press), 1993. ISBN 0-8133-1585-9
- Ward, Chip. (2007). "Chip Ward, How the Public Library Became Heartbreak Hotel: What They Didn't Teach Us in Library School: The Public Library as an Asylum for the Homeless". TomDispatch.com.
- Woolhouse, Megan, "Homes for the holiday: Housing agency, nonprofit team up to help the homeless", Boston Globe, December 25, 2007.
- Wortham, Jenna, "Use of Homeless as Internet Hot Spots Backfires on Marketer", The New York Times, March 12, 2012
- Wright, James D. (1989). Address Unknown: the homeless in America, 3rd ed. New York: A. de Gruyter.

=== Primary sources ===
- Webb, John N., and Malcolm Brown. Migrant Families (WPA, 1938), online as part 2 of Rural Poor in the Great Depression: Three Studies (1971); it covers transient families in the Federal Transient Program.
- Webb, John N. (1937). The Migratory-casual Worker.
