= Student homelessness in the United States =

Homelessness significantly reduces student graduation and retention. From 2019 to 2020, approximately 1.3 million students in public schools in the United States experienced homelessness.

== Statistics and demographics ==
According to the National Center for Homeless Education, there were more than 50,000 families with children who lost their home in 2022 and the number of homeless children reached more than one million in 2020. According to Esther Rivera, program manager of Denver Public Schools' Homeless Education Network, homeless families were supported by receiving vouchers for motels and food in Denver.

According to 2020 studies, the number of homeless students had reached its highest level in the last ten years. More than 1.5 million students live with their families or acquaintances due to the loss of their homes. According to the National Homeless Education Center, 7% of homeless students live in abandoned buildings or cars.

According to a 2019 report based on a survey the prior school year by Temple University's Hope Center for College, Community, and Justice, 55% of New York University students from its 19 campuses did not have secure housing. Due to financial problems or living in crowded houses, they were unable to pay electricity and rent bills and were constantly moving.

According to new federal data on 2019, the number of students in kindergarten through the 12th grade who are homeless has grown up by 70% over the last decade. In 2019, it was announced that compared to the last three years, the number of homeless students has increased by 20%. Since homeless students often do not use homeless shelters or sleep on the street, they are usually described as "hidden in plain sight". According to the report, 76% of homeless students lived in sharing house or lived with others. 14% of homeless student were in shelters, 6% of them were in their primary overnight accommodation of hotels or motels, and 4% were identified as "homeless".

== Causes ==
Homelessness is caused by many things, such as not having a suitable job, high house prices, domestic violence and drugs. Millions of people spend more than half of their income on housing and cannot afford to buy a home. In California, people have been forced to turn to inadequate housing due to housing shortages and rising rents. Factory closings and a deteriorating economy have made it difficult to pay rent. Two million people's addiction to drugs has caused parents to divorce and young people to leave their homes.

Seven out of ten people said that the cause of homelessness was being rejected from the family and being abused at home. Experts believe that providing affordable housing and supporting families who deal with drugs can help reduce the number of homeless students.

== Effects of homelessness ==
The Neighborhood Coalition for Shelter, or NCS, a non-profit organization founded in 1982, has launched a pilot project to remove educational barriers for homeless students of CUNY. CNN reported that food and housing insecurity affects the health and mental health of students and causes them to leave their education and reduce their income.

== Solution ==
California is the first state to budget for homelessness students. Some universities, such as those in California, have reduced the number of homeless students entering the university. The project to provide housing for Santa Cruz students was stopped by the people of the area due to the damage to the nature of the area. This project would support 3000 students. Experts believe that providing affordable housing and supporting families who deal with drugs can help reduce the number of homeless students.
