= Inner City Health Associates =

Homelessness organization in Toronto, Canada

- Abbreviation: ICHA
- Formation: 2005 (started); 2011 (officially incorporated)
- Headquarters: Toronto
- Services: Community healthcare
- Key people: Andrew Bond - Medical Director; Shivanee Nadarajah - Director of Operations
- Website: www.icha-toronto.ca

Inner City Health Associates (ICHA) is Canada's largest community healthcare organization for unhoused people and is based in Toronto.

== Organization ==
In 2014, Inner City Health Associates' team included over 65 medical doctors, including 29 family doctors and 32 psychiatrists. In 2014, ICHA provided healthcare services at over 40 shelters, drop in centers, street-outreach teams, and housing agencies. In 2010 ICHA provided 14,400 hours of care to 1,700 people.

Their work is primarily funded by the Ontario Health Insurance Plan.

== History ==
Inner City Health Associates was created after a advocacy campaign by doctors and administrators at St Michael's Hospital to the Ontario Ministry of Health to fund the delivery of healthcare in ways that addressed the specific challenges of delivering healthcare to people experiencing homelessness. The negotiations resulted in the agreement of the first variation from the standard physician payment plan in Canada. The organization was started in 2005 and officially incorporated in 2011.

The model of care was designed with patients, families, and other local stakeholders. ICHA works in partnership with donors and health policy-makers to focus on systems change, focused on community goals and barriers faced by patients and healthcare workers.

== Activities ==
ICHA primarily provides preventative health care, management of chronic, complex and acute illness, and mental health services. ICHA also runs specific programs that provide multi disciplinary street outreach services, and help shelter staff with data management

During the COVID-19 pandemic, it operated an isolation facility for people who were homeless, although disagreements between stakeholders initially delayed opening. The centre operated with difficulties due to its design. The centre received a $490,000 grant from the Public Health Agency of Canada's Immunization Partnership Fund to increase COVID-19 vaccine uptake among the homeless population in Toronto shelters.

== Challenges ==
The work of ICHA faces barriers that include tension between healthcare providers and community-based social service providers. Tension is exacerbated as both groups are governed by different patient privacy legislation in Ontario.

== Notable associates ==
- Leslie Shanks
- Naheed Dosani

== See also ==
- Homelessness in Canada
- Covenant House Toronto
- Seaton House
- Canadian Observatory on Homelessness
- Ontario Coalition Against Poverty
