= Leigh Chapman (nurse) =

Chief nursing officer in Canada

2nd Chief Nursing Officer of Canada
- Incumbent
- Assumed office August 23, 2022
- Preceded by: Verna Huffman Splane

Personal details
- Education: Trent University (BA); McMaster University (BScN, MSc); University of Toronto (PhD)

Leigh Chapman is a Canadian nurse. She has served as the Chief Nursing Officer of Canada since August 23, 2022. Chapman was the first nurse to occupy the role of CNO after the role was reinstated; the role was previously eliminated in 2011 by the Harper government.

== Career ==
Chapman trained as a nurse at McMaster University completing her Bachelor of Science in Nursing (BScN) in 2003 and Master of Science (MSc) in Clinical Health Services (Nursing) in 2005. In 2019, Chapman completed her PhD in nursing at the University of Toronto. Her dissertation was titled "Separate estates: A case study of competency assessment processes among clinicians in a Canadian academic hospital," and showed major gaps in building a common language and evaluative frameworks across professional groups. Nursing was Chapman's second degree.

Before being appointed to the CNO role, Chapman was the Director of Clinical Services with Inner City Health Associates.
