= Doctors for Defunding the Police =

Toronto physician advocacy group

- Founding members: Naheed Dosani; Andrew Boozary; Semir Bulle; Suzanne Shoush; Ritika Goel; Michaela Beder; Bahar Orang; Saadia Sediqzadah; Nanky Rai
- Website: doctorsfordefundingpolice.com

Doctors for Defunding the Police is a group of Toronto, Canada, doctors that campaign to shift Toronto City Council spending away from police and towards social services.

== Organization ==
Doctors for Defunding the Police is a Toronto-based group of healthcare providers who advocate for shifting Toronto City Council spending away from police services and towards healthcare and education. Founders include Suzanne Shoush M.D.

In 2020, the group protested with other social justice groups outside the Toronto Police Service headquarters.

== Publications ==
Via a their 2020 publication Policing is a Public Health Crisis, the group has called for greater transparency in the Toronto Police Service budget with a request for specific clarification about why police spending has been prioritized over education, healthcare (including mental health), and housing. The paper calls for changes to police use-of-force, including prohibition of use of harm and other lethal force, and the disarming of police. The group calls to move funding away from the police budget towards new community-led emergency response teams.

== See also ==
- Reach Out Response Network
