= Survival sex =

Act of engaging in prostitution for an extreme need

Survival sex is a form of prostitution engaged in by people because of their extreme need. It can include trading sex for food, a place to sleep, or other basic needs; it can also be used to obtain addictive drugs. Survival sex is engaged in by homeless people, refugees, asylum seekers, and others disadvantaged in society.

The term is used by sex trade, poverty researchers, and aid workers.

== Prevalence ==
Survival sex is common throughout the world, and has been extensively studied in many countries including Afghanistan, Cuba, the United States, Canada, Mexico, Jamaica, the Philippines, Thailand, New Zealand, Colombia, Kenya, Uganda, and South Africa.

Researchers estimate that of homeless youth in North America, one in three has engaged in survival sex. In one study of homeless youth in Los Angeles, about one-third of females and half of males said they had engaged in survival sex. Likelihood increases with the number of days the youth has been homeless, experience of being victimized, engaging in criminal behaviour, using illegal substances, attempting suicide, being pregnant, or having an STI.

Lesbian, gay, bisexual and transgender street children are three times likelier to engage in survival sex compared with their heterosexual counterparts, according to one study. Another found that transgender youth are most likely of all to engage in survival sex.

Survival sex is common in refugee camps. In internally displaced persons camps in northern Uganda, where 1.4 million civilians have been displaced by conflict between Ugandan government forces and the militant Lord's Resistance Army, Human Rights Watch reported in 2005 that displaced women and girls were engaging in survival sex with other camp residents, local defense personnel, and Ugandan government soldiers.

== Motivations ==
Some researchers say that street children do not always see survival sex as exploitative: rather, they sometimes characterize it as the "beginning of a potential relationship." Given that one of the strongest predictors of engagement in survival sex is a prior history of sexual abuse by adult caregivers, some researchers theorize that rather than being driven to survival sex out of desperation, street children might be reproducing familiar behaviour and relationship patterns.

== Outreach and law enforcement ==
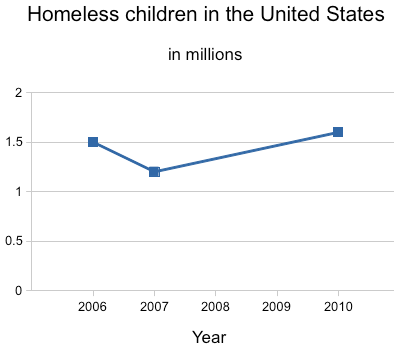
The number of homeless children in the US grew from 1.2 million in 2007 to 1.6 million in 2010.

US municipalities such as Boston and Dallas have noticed a sharp increase in runaways engaging in survival sex since 1999. Dallas established a special group home for counseling, from which 75% of the underage girls who receive treatment do not return to prostitution. Congress nearly approved a program for cities to create pilot programs modeled on the Dallas system in 2007, but never appropriated the necessary funds. The Department of Justice has yet to study the number of children involved in prostitution even though they were authorized by Congress to do so in 2005. However, the Center for Problem Oriented Policing claims, "there is no consensus on whether the practice is widespread," and recommends that runaways should be questioned about sexual abuse but not consensual sex, survival sex, or prostitution.

According to the National Alliance to End Homelessness, outreach services to help sexually exploited youth should focus on the locations where they congregate and are approached by pimps for exploitation, including public spaces such as malls and schools, and the internet. Outreach workers need to develop a close professional relationship with law enforcement to learn about trends and locations, but should carefully avoid compromising their independence or the confidentiality of their clients. Local law enforcement should target pimps and customers (janes or johns) and not the victims (youth and young adult prostitutes) for prosecution to be effective. Partnerships between nonprofit programs and law enforcement can help offer survival sex worker victims community-based services and housing when they are picked up by police officers.

According to ECPAT International, when sex industry women and children victims are held in police custody or remand homes, denied freedom and access to information, or abused by police, they are encouraged to lie about their situation and try to escape, so community assistance services are substantially less useful. Similar failures occur when court procedures do not allow victim testimony or representation or, when they do, are neither victim-friendly nor children-friendly; or when decisions on children's futures seldom include the opinions of children, or when the right to privacy is violated by media reporting, or by stigmatization of and discrimination against children exploited in prostitution. Governments have the duty to provide services to children, but sharing that duty with nonprofits by coordination, monitoring, and support, especially with respect to periodic review of placement, is likely to have the best results. Protection measures for children at all stages of the legal process has not been sufficiently implemented through children-friendly courts, justice systems and law enforcement agencies. Decriminalization of children exploited in prostitution is a substantial gap in addressing survival sex worldwide. Successful law enforcement partnerships have included a campaign of brothel-based prostitutes who policed the recruitment of under-age girls in Bangladesh.

== Outcomes ==
Engaging in survival sex can have serious effects, mentally and physically damaging to youth into adulthood and adulthood into elderhood. Research shows: Depression, anxiety, and anger issues are the most commonly reported emotional responses within children and adults who have participated in some form of survival sex. Untreated STIs, chronic pelvic pain, dyspareunia, vaginismus and gastrointestinal disorder are just a few common physical issues known due to a lower rate of people who engage in this behavior seeking out medical care. High suicides attempts, PTSD and over victimizing are also common side effects to engaging in this activity.

== See also ==
- Forced prostitution
- Hypergamy
- Sexual capital
