= Covenant House Toronto =

Canadian non-profit organization

- Founded: Toronto, Ontario, Canada (1982)
- Type: Non-profit
- Location(s): 20 Gerrard Street East; Toronto, Ontario; M5B 2P3
- Services: Food, shelter and a variety of services to homeless youth between the ages of 16 and 24
- Website: www.covenanthousetoronto.ca

Covenant House Toronto is a nonprofit organization that serves at-risk, homeless and trafficked youth between the ages of 16 and 24. It is based in Toronto, Ontario, Canada, and is one of many Covenant House locations based in North America. The Toronto location is the largest agency of its kind in Canada, with 80 per cent of their annual funding coming from donors. The house serves as many as 300 youth a day regardless of their race, religion, sexual orientation, gender identity, or the circumstances that have brought them to their doors. Covenant House also offers services such as education, after-care, counselling, health care, employment assistance, and job training. The organization has also offered their services to more than 95,000 young people since its start in 1982.

== History ==
Covenant House began its operations in Toronto after Cardinal Carter gathered the local community to support children sleeping outside his office. The 30-bed shelter opened in 1982 and became the second international site established by the childcare agency. In the late 1980s, the house had achieved a big milestone by opening an on-site health clinic and school. In the 1990s, Covenant House managed to open up programs such as an employment service program, increasing the size capacity by 48 per cent and providing access to long term residence. During the 2000s, the house had started its own culinary arts program, and built a rooftop garden for therapeutic services. In 2006, the organization launched the “Arts and Minds” program, which provides day programs for youth with mental health issues. In 2010, the shelter achieved another milestone by launching a renovated job centre, on-site adult education, and an Urban Response Model, which is an anti-sex trafficking plan. Since then, Covenant House has established itself by employing 200 professionals at the facility to support the youth of Toronto in any issue that seems fit.

== Issues ==
According to a study by Covenant House, youth homelessness, child welfare, sex trafficking and youth employment are the biggest issues youth in Canada face today.

=== Youth homelessness ===
Youth homelessness is one of the growing issues in Canada. Case studies argue that the issue of street kids is largely misunderstood. In Canada, there are many youths who struggle to call a place home. Actions such as couch surfing, sleeping in shelters, parks, alleyways, or even random doorways are very common. Research shows that many kids who live on the street left their homes because they did not want to live under their parents' rules. Some fled their homes due to mental health, trauma, or sexual abuse. Mental health issues are a major factor in youth homelessness. Covenant House makes sure that mental health is one of their top priorities, because 40 per cent of youth that enter the facility have some form of mental health issue. Covenant House has seen a reported demographic shift from the aboriginal community, black youth, and LGBT youth that make up between 25 and 40 per cent of youth unhoused in Toronto. A recent study showed that around 40 per cent of youth unhoused that were under 16 experienced their first form of homelessness. Without proper housing, full-fledged meals, clean clothes and showers, it is hard for a youth to mobilize towards a good future because they suffer from a lack of basic necessities. At Covenant House, it is their mission to end youth homelessness by offering a wide number of services and support.

=== Leaving child welfare ===
Some children and youth live under the child welfare system when a family is in crisis. This can include youth who have suffered from abuse, neglect, and trauma. There are children who go into foster care and end up with new families. According to research, that is not always the case due to the experiences and trauma that plague a child's mind of not being comfortable with their current living situation. This situation leads to many youths running away from their homes and living on the streets. In Ontario, the age limit to be eligible under the child welfare system is 18. In some cases, a child can receive support up to the age of 21. The main issue lacking in the system is the opt-out age of 16. One study has shown that youth lacking maturity tend to leave the system because they feel that the system never cared for them in the first place. The study conducted by the Provincial Advocate for Children and Youth found that many youths are leaving care and struggling to live independently. In the study, it states that 60 per cent of the youth unhoused reported having had some form of involvement with the child welfare system.

=== Sex trafficking ===
Sex trafficking in Canada is a widespread issue with 63 per cent of human trafficking victims in Ontario being Canadian citizens. Covenant House views sex trafficking as modern-day slavery. Youth unhoused have become the biggest target of exploitation. Most of the sex trafficking victims were young Canadian girls. The average age of sex trafficking is reported to be 17 years old. Many of the victims suffer from Stockholm Syndrome. Since 2014, Toronto Police have brought the issue into the limelight by formalizing an anti-trafficking team. Since the beginning of the operation, Toronto has seen an increase of over 113 per cent in occurrences and have made arrests 360 per cent more than in the last year.

=== Youth employment ===
Another big issue that leads to youth homelessness is youth unemployment. The main cause of this issue focuses on how the homeless lack basic education, life skills, job experience, and stability to keep their employment. The drop-out rate for youth unhoused is at an all-time high of 53 per cent. Covenant House believes that kids who do not have a support system and necessities have a hard time seeking a job and keeping employment.

== Services and programs ==
=== The Facility ===
At Toronto's Covenant House, troubled youth are provided with fresh meals, a clean bed, and a haven from outside danger. The house is a 96-bed shelter that is split into two different floors based on gender. Each floor is split into different rooms with a maximum of 3 beds. Majority of the rooms consist of double and limited single beds. These rooms are well maintained that provide the youth with basic amenities such as underwear, socks, shampoo, pajamas, toothbrush, and bodywash.

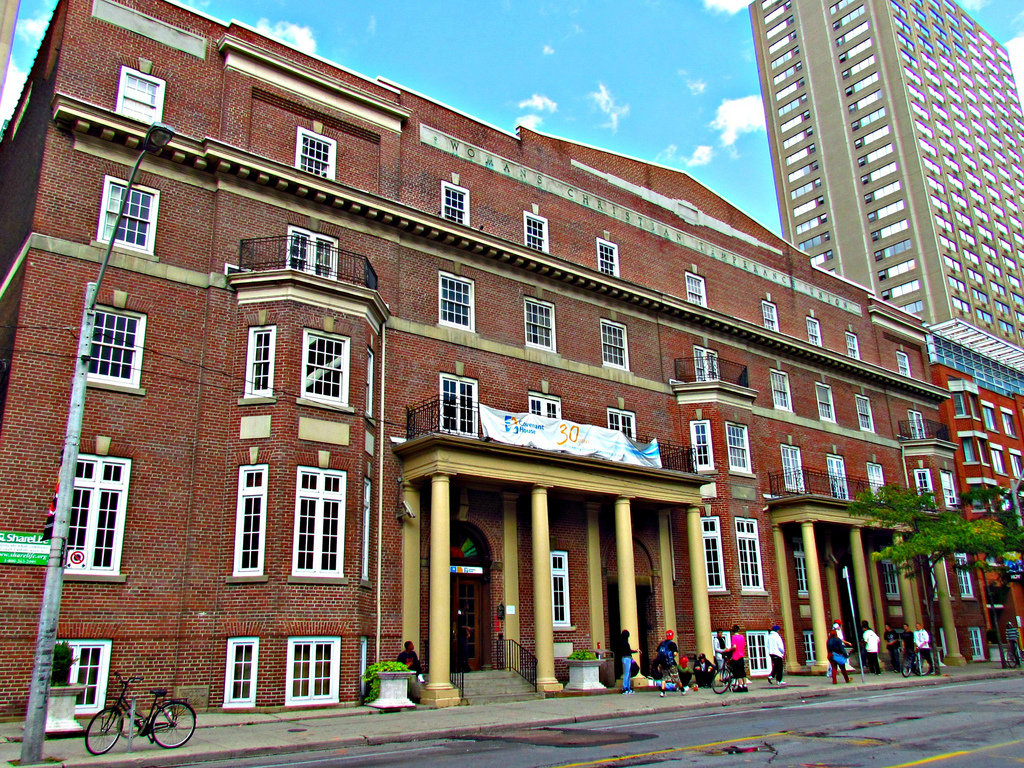
The outer view of Covenant House Toronto. Located at 20 Gerrard St E, Toronto, ON M5B 2P3

=== Family Link ===
In the Family Link, Covenant House volunteers work with each youth to re-establish broken relationships with their family and friends. The organization also works on preventing youth in the community from leaving their homes and living in the street. The Family Link program counsels youth from the ages of 16 to 24 who are living at the shelter to start reconnecting with a family member, friend, or trusted guardian. The program also looks at how counsellors can counsel youth to improve their relationships with their families. The program also enables parents to get involved with their kids by joining family counselling sessions and receiving advice from a counsellor.

=== BensKids Health Centre ===
The BensKids Health Centre is an onsite clinic that helps youth unhoused overcome the physical, emotional and psychological tolls of living on the streets. The clinic serves anyone that comes through, even if they do not have any health coverage or any form of ID. The clinic is open to kids five days a week with no limitations. The clinic is staffed with five nurses, three family doctors, volunteer massage therapists, and counsellors; one adolescent medicine specialist and two psychiatrists. The clinic also provides on-site testing for any medical emergency.

=== Onsite School ===
Covenant House claims that youth unhoused have had their education privileges taken from them because of their unfortunate circumstances. Covenant House has started a day school for youth between 16 and 21 that offers high school credits and access to e-learning with dedicated onsite teachers to help the kids with any educational matter. The school offers compulsory and elective courses that can help a youth graduate high school. Covenant House also offers schooling for youth aged 22 to 26 by offering them an online adult education program that helps the young adults to achieve their high school diploma.

=== Job Training Programs ===
Covenant House Toronto provides different workplace programs that help youth gain experience in the outer world. The organization has their own culinary arts training program called Cooking for Life. The program is led by and executive chef who trains the youth for entry-level jobs in the hospitality industry. Covenant House pays for all the fees for all students to achieve their job placement, which includes the Food Handlers certificate.

=== Job Centre ===
At the Job Centre, young people are given the tools and material to find a job and have a sustainable income. The job centre also helps struggling youth with ideas on how to live independently by having one-on-one sessions. In these sessions, counsellors look at the person's interests, challenges, and strengths to determine an appropriate career path. The centre helps the youth by helping them create a resume and weekly coaching meetings. On Interview Day, kids are provided with the appropriate attire and transportation.

=== Support Services ===
Covenant House has established their own Community Support Services (CSS) that offer youth who do not live in the shelter the same support system as the residents who live in the house. CSS looks to help the youth of the community to be independent and have stability in their lives. Youth workers always welcome youth by having regular appointments and counselling sessions. Some of the ways the CSS helps the kids is by providing them with housing support. This support is used to help a youth get accustomed to his or her lifestyle of living independently. CSS also helps youth who are going through a rough transition in their lives with counselling sessions. CSS also provides goods, clothing and food items to kids who are starting their new independent lives.

=== Presentations and Training ===
Covenant House is deeply committed to bringing more awareness and knowledge regarding the issue of youth homelessness. In the presentation, the issues surrounding sex trafficking, youth homelessness and exploitation are heavily discussed. Covenant House also offers presentations and workshops to students, health care professionals, transport and security staff, child welfare and social workers and other stakeholders.

=== Lise Watier: This is Me! Girls Program ===
The program is sponsored by the Lise Watier Foundation and collaboration with the girls at Covenant House. The program offers girls life skills workshops and speeches from influential female mentor speakers. The program also creates a safe space for women to embrace anything that is on their minds. A Toronto study showed that girls unhoused were ten times more likely to be sexually assaulted than girls with normal housing. The report states that 23 per cent of women unhoused have traded sex for food. This leads to heavy mental health issues like addiction, self-harm, and eating disorders. There is even a higher chance of unplanned pregnancy. The program's motto includes the “Seven C’s”. They are Confidence, Character, Control, Coping, Competence, Connection, and Contribution. The core elements of the programs run from providing necessities, female focused programming, mentorship, one-on-one counselling, monthly reflection meetings, safe girls’ space, special outings, and physical fitness.

=== Just Like A Girl You Know ===
In 2017, Covenant House launched a five-year, $10 million campaign to bring more awareness to sex trafficking in Ontario. Most of the funding depends on donations, and only 20 per cent of the programming will be funded by the government. The Archdiocese of Toronto has pledged $600,000 every year to support this cause. The organization published a four-minute video explaining on real experiences of everyday teens being the victims of sex trafficking in the province. The campaign was chaired by Canadian philanthropist Suzanne Rogers. Covenant House opened up “The Rogers Home” which is a transitional housing program that will provides services for victims of sex trafficking.
