= Rachel Bromberg =

Canadian activist

Rachel Bromberg is a Canadian activist for community-led response to 911 calls and the co-founder of both Reach Out Response Network and the International Mobile Services Association.

== Education ==
Bromberg was a fellow at the Yale University Program for Recovery and Community Health and is completing a dual degree in law and social work at the University of Toronto.

== Career and advocacy ==
Bromberg worked at youth mental health organization Stella's Place, before co-writing an op-ed with colleague Asante Haughton advocating for community-led responses to 911 calls about mental health crisis. She later co-founded Reach Out Response Network with Haughton and has worked with groups in the US who have run community responses.

She also co-founded the International Mobile Services Association where she works on community-led crises response.

She is a member of the Toronto Regional Human Services and Justice Coordinating Committee and a member of the Centre for Addiction and Mental Health's Constituency Council.

Bromberg serves on the board of directors of the Ontario Peer Development Initiative.
