= Asante Haughton =

Canadian mental health worker

Asante Haughton born July 31st 1985 is a Jamaican-born Toronto-based human rights and mental health advocate and the co-founder of Reach Out Response Network.

== Family life ==
Haughton was born Jamaica before moving to Toronto with mother where he was a gifted student. He has two brothers.

Haughton speaks openly about his depression and anxiety which developed from his experiences as a 10th-grade student when his mother tried to take her own life, but ended up instead hospitalized for months.

He used poetry and rap as an outlet for his emotions and excelled at basketball before getting help from his family doctor.

== Career and activism ==
Haughton is the manager of peer support training at Stella's Place youth mental health organization in Toronto and a mental health consultant for Vice.

He co-founded Reach Out Response Network with Rachel Bromberg in 2020 and contracted COVID-19 the same year.

He does research with the Centre for Addiction and Mental Health.

=== Music career ===
Haughton raps and has collaborated with Toronto rapper D-Sisive.

=== Publications ===
- Haughton wrote the foreword for Brainstorm Revolution: True mental health stories of love, personal evolution, and cultural revolution, 2018 ISBN 978-1-894813-95-2
- Haughton, A, Ashcroft, R, Menear, M, Greenblatt, A, et al. "Patient perspectives on quality of care for depression and anxiety in primary health care teams: A qualitative study". Health Expectations. 2021; 24: 1168– 1177. doi:10.1111/hex.13242
- Ferrari, M., Flora, N., Anderson, K.K., Haughton, A., Tuck, A., Archie, S., Kidd, S., McKenzie, K. and (2018),"Gender differences in pathways to care for early psychosis". Early Intervention in Psychiatry, 12: 355-361. doi:10.1111/eip.12324

"Asante has also recently contributed his poetry and writing to a book called, AfriCANthology, a collection of poems, stories and essays by Black artists and thinkers." https://www.codebreakeredu.com/leadership-team/asantehaughton/
