= Stephen Gaetz =

Canadian activist

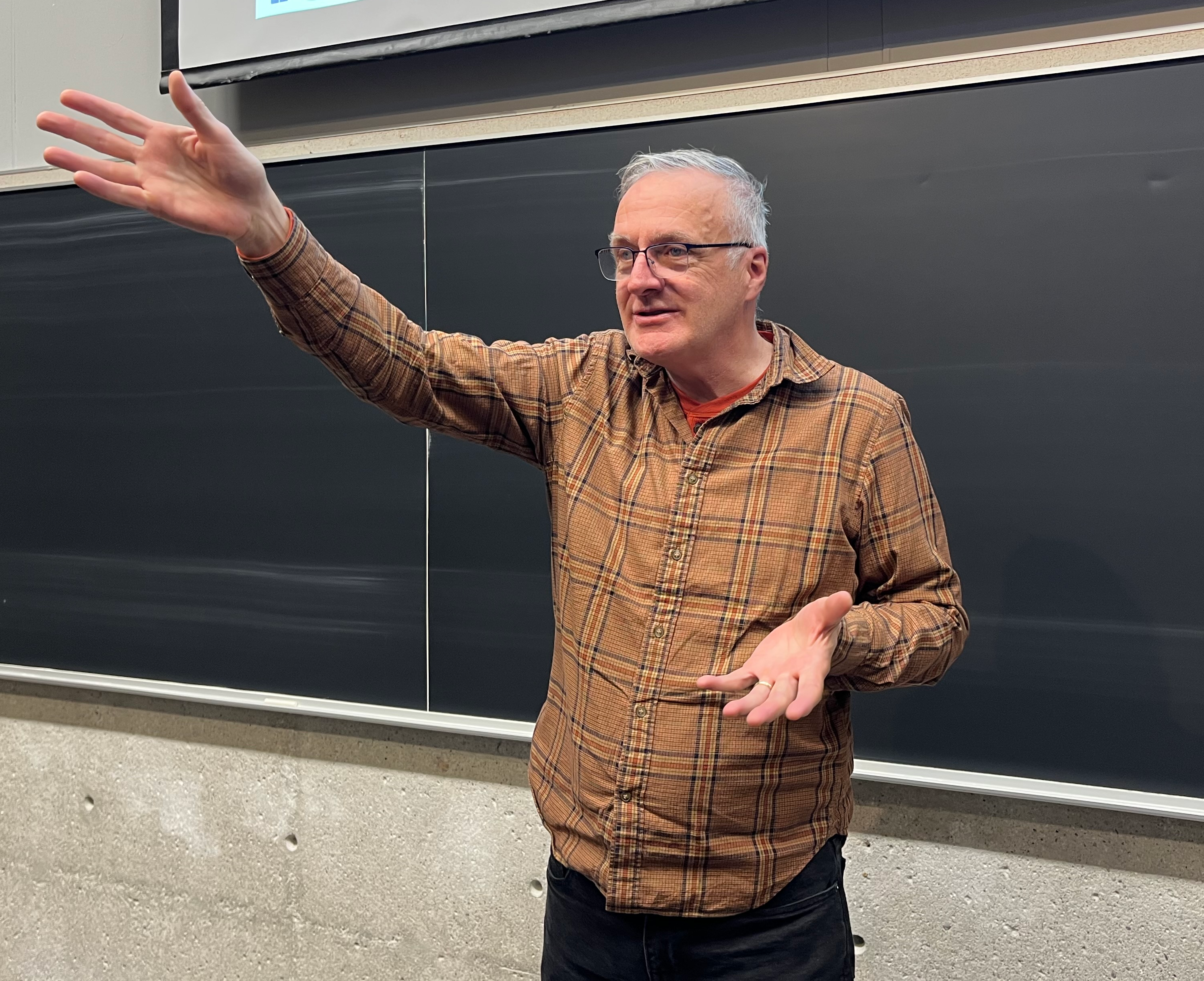
Dr. Gaetz in a lecture hall at York University

Stephen Gaetz OC, is the director of the Canadian Observatory on Homelessness (COH) and a professor at the Faculty of Education at York University in Toronto, Ontario, Canada. Dr. Gaetz has enhanced pan-Canadian collaboration between stakeholders interested in homelessness research in Canada.

He was the Chair of the Organizing Committee of the Canadian Conference on Homelessness held at York University in 2005, The event brought together over 800 people who conduct research, provide services, develop programs and formulate policy regarding homelessness in Canada. In addition, Dr. Gaetz has also been guest editor of a special issue of the Canadian Review of Social Policy focusing on homelessness.

Dr. Gaetz’ research interests include homelessness, youth culture, criminal victimization and community development His research on street youth has focused on their economic strategies, health issues and legal and justice issues, and has resulted in numerous publications in scholarly journals. His research on street youth and oral health was used to advocate for better dental services for marginalized populations. This research played an important role in establishing Canada's first free dental service for street youth. Prior to York University, Dr. Gaetz worked in the community health sector, including the Shout Clinic (a health clinic for street youth in Toronto), as well as Queen West Community Health Centre in Toronto.

Dr. Gaetz has currently received multi-year funding from the Social Sciences and Humanities Research Council (SSHRC) to establish the Canadian Homelessness Research Network. The goal of this network is to work with researchers, service providers, government representatives, and the general public across Canada, in order to mobilize homelessness research for greater impact on homelessness policy and planning.

Finally, he is the Principal Investigator and Director of the Canadian Observatory on Homelessness/Homeless Hub, from the 2008, SSHRC Cluster Grant proposal which garnered him a 7-year grant. The Homeless Hub is an online research library and information center containing more than 25,000, homelessness related items.

He serves as secretary of the Canadian Alliance to End Homelessness, with Alex Himelfarb as chair and Tim Richter as vice-chair. The organisation, which is affiliated with York University and modelled on an American initiative established in 2000, focuses on ten-year plans to end homelessness and Housing First approaches.

He was appointed into the Order of Canada with the grade of member, one of Canada's highest civilian honours.
