= Eastview Secondary School =

Public secondary school in Barrie, Ontario, Canada

Location
- 421 Grove Street East; Barrie, Ontario, L4M 5S1; Canada; 44.4053°N 79.6618°W

Information
- Established: 1967
- School board: Simcoe County District School Board
- School number: 907383
- Principal: David Brooks
- Grades: 9 - 12
- Enrollment: 1356 (2020–21)
- Colours: red, blue and gold
- Team name: Eastview Wildcats
- Website: eas.scdsb.on.ca

Eastview Secondary School is a public secondary school (grades 9–12) located in northeastern Barrie, Ontario, Canada. It has an enrollment of about 1,400 students.

Eastview is one of the largest high schools in Barrie, Ontario, serving students from the east end of Barrie, as well as the south portions of Oro-Medonte Township (Horseshoe Valley, Shanty Bay, Crown Hill) and Springwater Township. It has a string-music program, making it unique in the county. The mascot of the school is a Wildcat.

== Computing history ==
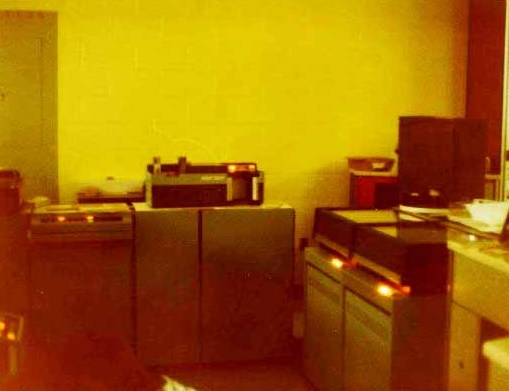

Built in 1967, Eastview was equipped with the first student accessible mainframe computer in Simcoe County. The General Electric GE-115 was equipped with 12K of magnetic-core memory and a hard disk drive with a removable disk pack. The GE-115 computer was housed in a climate controlled room and operated by students. Students at Eastview could use punched card decks to submit FORTRAN and COBOL programs to be run by the student operators. Other high schools sent in their programs encoded on mark sense cards and would receive the output bundled around their cards after their jobs were submitted. With the advent of the microcomputer in the late 1970s, Eastview computer curriculum grew to include courses based on the Tandy Corporation TRS-80 and Commodore PET using the computer language, BASIC. In 1981, the GE-115 mainframe computer was dismantled and shipped to the Canada Science and Technology Museum.

== French Immersion Program ==
Eastview Secondary School offers three French Second Language (FSL) streams: Core French, Extended French, and French Immersion.

== Notable alumni ==
- Mike Hoffman (ice hockey, born 1963), NHL player
- Leslie Shanks, Humanitarian medical doctor "Local Stories".

== See also ==
- Education in Ontario
- List of secondary schools in Ontario
