= Canadian Flowers for Food Society =

Canadian non-profit organisation

The Canadian Flowers for Food Society (Flowers for Food) is a non-profit organisation started in 2005 in Vancouver, British Columbia, Canada, by Marrett Green. Flowers for Food collects floral discards from major flower growers and distributors in the Vancouver area and delivers them to other charitable programs, services, and homeless persons, who in turn market them streetside for donations. Flowers for Food is a registered Canadian charity under paragraph 149(1)(f) of the Income Tax Act and is also a registered BC Society (BN: 84141 0756 RC001).

== Composting project ==
Flowers for Food also has a composting project. This non-profit venture was designed to divert organic floral waste from Greater Vancouver Regional District landfills to composting stations that are managed by Flowers for Food volunteers and their paid associates. Finished compost is sold to the public.

== See also ==
- Poverty reduction
- Homelessness in Canada
