= Homelessness in Canada =

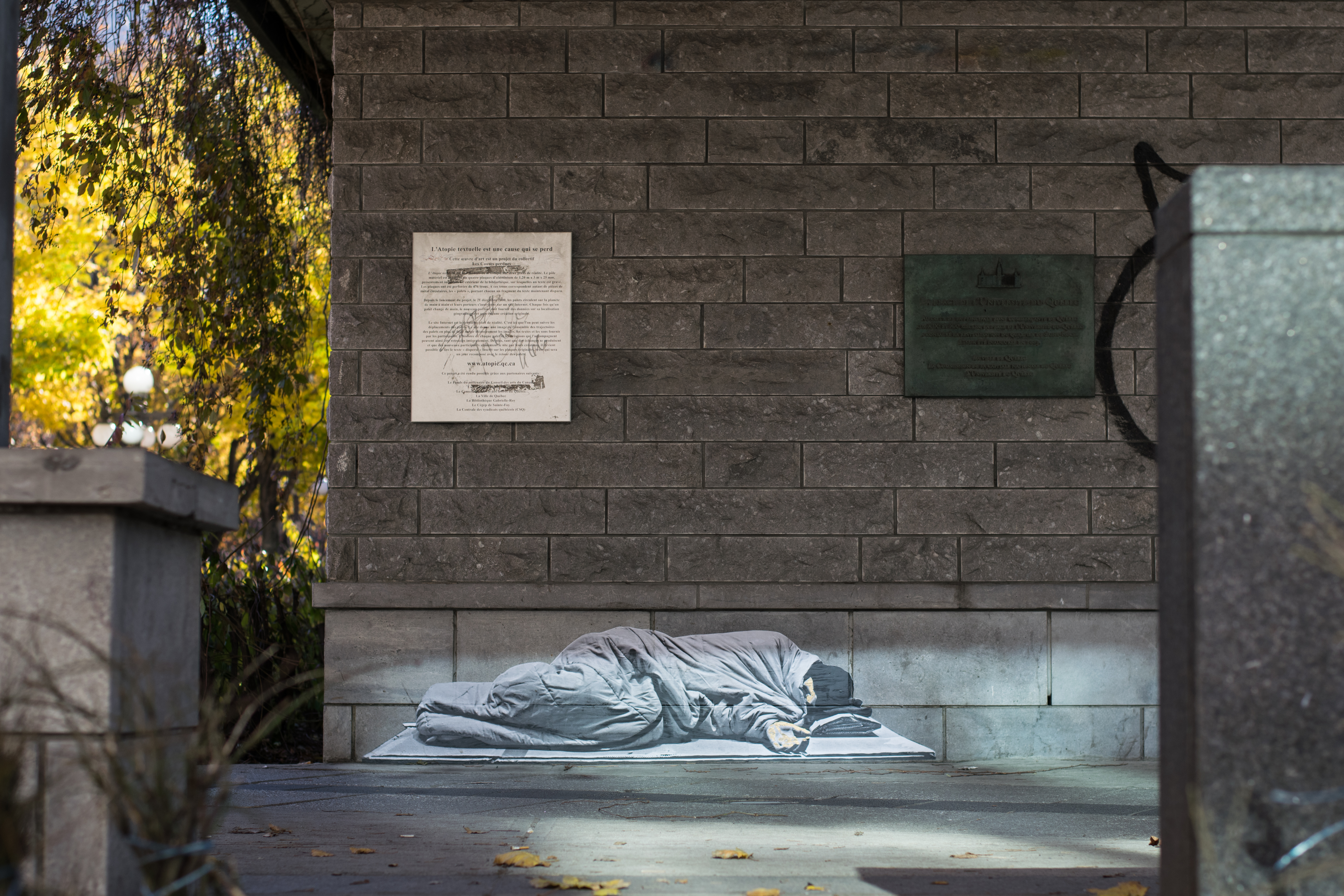
Graffiti of homeless in Quebec City

Homelessness in Canada refers to the condition of individuals and families lacking stable, permanent, and adequate housing, and includes both visible forms of homelessness (such as living in shelters or public spaces) and less visible forms such as crisis accommodation, couch surfing, or living in unsafe or overcrowded conditions.

The Canadian government housing policies and programs in place throughout the 1970s were based on a concept of shelter as a basic need or requirement for survival and of the obligation of government and society to provide adequate housing for everyone.

== Definition ==
In 2007 most research and programs in Canada focused on "absolute homelessness" and there was no consistent definition of homelessness. In 2012 the York University-based Canadian Homelessness Research Network (CHRN) released the first Canadian definition of homelessness.

"Homelessness describes the situation of an individual or family without stable, permanent, appropriate housing, or the immediate prospect, means and ability of acquiring it. It is the result of systemic or societal barriers, a lack of affordable and appropriate housing, the individual/household’s financial, mental, cognitive, behavioural or physical challenges, and/or racism and discrimination. Most people do not choose to be homeless, and the experience is generally negative, unpleasant, stressful and distressing."

— CHRN, 2012

Stephen Gaetz, a homelessness researcher at York University, argued that the detailed classification of homelessness provided governments with more "precision" in creating effective programs to respond to specific needs. The report cites four categories of homelessness, unsheltered, emergency-sheltered, provisionally-accommodated, and at risk of homelessness. The definition received a lot of support from advocates for the homeless. Critics included Peter Goldring, an Alberta MP, member of the Edmonton Committee to End Homelessness, who argued that the CHRN's definition of homelessness painted an overly broad picture including those who were "having a hard time financially." Goldring felt that, "You don't want to look at it coldly, but they're really not in desperate need until they're holding that eviction notice in their hand."

== Timeline ==
Until the 1980s, homelessness was not seen as a social problem. Public policies shifted away from rehousing in the 1980s in wealthy Western countries like Canada, which led to a de-housing of households that had previously been housed. By 1987, when the United Nations established the International Year of Shelter for the Homeless (IYSH), homelessness had become a serious social problem in Canada. The report of the major 1987 IYSH conference held in Ottawa said that housing was not a high priority for government, and this was a significant contributor to the homelessness problem. While there was a demand for adequate and affordable housing for low income Canadian families, government funding was not available. In the 1980s a "wider segment of the population" began to experience homelessness for the first time – evident through their use of emergency shelters and soup kitchens. Shelters began to experience overcrowding, and demand for services for the homeless was constantly increasing.

In the 1990s, a series of cuts were made to national housing programs by the federal government. While Canada's economy was robust, the cuts continued and in some cases accelerated in the 1990s, including cuts to the 1973 national affordable housing program. The government solution for homelessness was to create more homeless shelters and to increase emergency services. In the larger metropolitan areas like Toronto the use of homeless shelters increased by 75% from 1988 to 1998. Urban centres such as Montreal, Laval, Vancouver, Edmonton, and Calgary all experienced increasing homelessness.

In Action Plan 2011, the Federal Government of Canada proposed $120 million annually from April 2014 until April 2019—with $70 million in new funding—to renew its Homelessness Partnering Strategy (HPS) with a focus on the Housing First model. Private or public organizations across Canada were eligible for HPS subsidies to implement Housing First program

On April 1, 2019, Reaching Home: Canada’s Homelessness Strategy replaced the Homelessness Partnering Strategy, with the primary goal of reducing chronic homelessness by 50 percent by 2027-28. To meet this goal, the Federal Government of Canada proposed investing $4 billion over nine years. In 2019, there was an estimated 29,927 shelter users experiencing chronic homelessness.

== Homeless count ==
By 2008 the annual homeless count was considered to be a politically charged and methodologically contentious issue. The federal estimate of the core number of homeless people in Canada was 200,000 in 2005, or about 1 per cent of the population. Homeless advocates estimated it to be closer to 20,000 annually, or 30,000 on any given night plus those in the hidden homeless category. This includes 6,000 youth nightly and 30,000 youth annually. The percentage of Indigenous people who are homeless is more than three times compared to the rest of the population.

== Cost of homelessness ==
Based on the more conservative figure, the annual cost of homelessness in Canada in 2008 was approximately $5.1 to $7 billion in emergency services, organizations, and non-profits.

== Misconceptions ==
Homelessness is a chronic problem for only a small minority of people; the vast majority of individuals are "one-time only" shelter users or experience episodic homelessness. However, this distinctly different subgroup of individuals who are "chronically homeless" consume about half of shelter beds and available resources at any given time.

Some of the homeless who make use of homeless shelters are also employed. Individuals and families are often simply priced out of private housing markets. In 1999, 2.8 million Canadian households (about 26%) fell below the minimum amount required to afford a basic home, gauged at $25,920. Five years later, this number rose to 3.2 million households (remaining about 26%).

== History ==
The term "homeless" came into use in Canada after 1962 in reference to people who were "unhoused" versus those simply living in poor-quality housing. Previously, the "homeless" was a general term applied mostly to transient men with no family ties, such as the migrant workers who travelled by freight hopping during the Great Depression.

Homelessness remained a minor concern as long as extremely cheap accommodation was available in 'skid row' rooming houses or flophouses located in the poorest parts of most major cities. Even the most destitute could find some form of housing, even if its quality was abysmal.

At the end of the Second World War in 1946, the federal government created the Canadian Mortgage and Housing Corporation (CMHC) to make mortgages and home ownership more accessible to people and organizations. The surplus generated by the CMHC was used in the 1980s to fund non-profit, Aboriginal, and rent supplement housing.

Homelessness in Canada was not a social problem until the 1980s, according to the University of Toronto's J. David Hulchanski keynote lecture at a 2009 conference, "Housing and Homelessness in Canada". Hulchanski said that public housing policies through the 1970s were based on a concept of shelter as a basic need for survival and that both society and government had responsibilities and obligations to see that see that everyone was adequately housed. Until the 1980s, this approach to housing policy saw "urban planners, public health officials, and social workers" focus on "rehousing people into better housing and neighbourhoods", not only in Canada but in other wealthier Western countries. About 20,000 social housing units were created every year following the 1973 amendments to the National Housing Act.

Starting in the mid-1980s, the federal government initiated a series of cuts in funding for national housing programs.

During the 1980s the social problem of dehousing had emerged in which people who were previously housed started to experience dehousing.

During 1987, the International Year of Shelter for the Homeless (IYSH), conferences on homelessness were held all across Canada. A 1988 report endorsed by participants at the Ottawa conference, said that a "significant component of the homelessness problem is that housing has not been a high priority for governments at any level." The report noted that while there was a demand for "adequate and affordable" housing for low income households, there was insufficient "government funds to carry out effective social housing programs".

A 1999 comprehensive Parliamentary Research Bureau report said that while it was difficult to provide exact statistics on the number of people experiencing homelessness in the 1980s in Canada, their research showed that homelessness was increasing and that it affected a "wider segment of the population". This was evident as groups of people began to use emergency shelters and soup kitchens for the first time; shelters were becoming overcrowded, and the demand for services for the homeless was constantly increasing.

Despite Canada's economy this trend continued, and perhaps even accelerated in the 1990s.

For example, in Toronto admissions to homeless shelters increased by 75% between 1988 and 1998. After 1993 the national affordable housing program initiated in 1973 was cut and Canada's focus in addressing homelessness in the 1990s was to create more homeless shelters and emergency services. A decade later in 2003 the federal government resumed spending on housing investment at $2.03 billion, a 25% decline from 1993 levels of $1.98 billion when adjusted for inflation.

Following changes to Canada's National Housing Act housing act in 1996 to give the CMHC "more flexibility", it was able to directly fund social housing and its role in supporting new and existing affordable housing diminished. Today the CMHC still exists, and its annual surpluses ($7.6 billion in 2006) raises questions as to why some of this money cannot be spent on new housing initiatives.

On December 19, 2006, Prime Minister Harper announced social policies with $526 million of funding to tackle poverty and homelessness in Canada. The Homelessness Partnering Strategy received $270 million and Canada Mortgage and Housing Corporation received $246 million to refurbish and renovate affordable housing, as well as to improve access for homeless people to various services and supports such as health and substance abuse treatment programs. Activists protested at Human Resources and Social Services Minister Diane Finley's offices in Ottawa.

The first Canadian national report card on homelessness was compiled by the Canadian Homelessness Research Network (CHRN) and the National Alliance to End Homelessness in 2013. (Note: This research used the 2012 Canadian Homelessness Research Network (CHRN)definition of homelessness.)

== Causes ==
Factors that can lead an individual to become homeless vary widely, however the most common reasons include financial challenges, conflict or abuse in previous homes, and health issues. Other factors can include mental disorders, leaving foster care, exiting from jail or hospitalization, immigration, rising housing costs and decreased rent controls, federal and provincial downloading of housing programs, and low social assistance rates.

While the causes are complex, the solutions to homelessness may be simple: "Homelessness may not be only a housing problem, but it is always a housing problem; housing is necessary, although sometimes not sufficient, to solve the problem of homelessness." Policy changes are often criticized for punishing the poor instead of trying to solve the underlying problem.

=== Lack of low-income housing ===
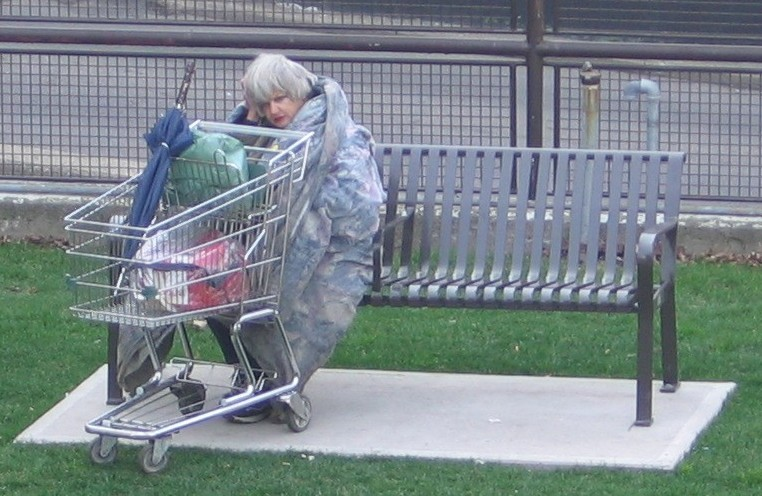
A homeless Toronto woman sits on a park bench.

While in 1966 30,000 new low-income housing units had been built across Canada, this had fallen to 7,000 in 1999. In the city of Calgary, with one of the most acute housing shortages, only 16 new units of rental housing were built in 1996.

=== Deinstitutionalization ===
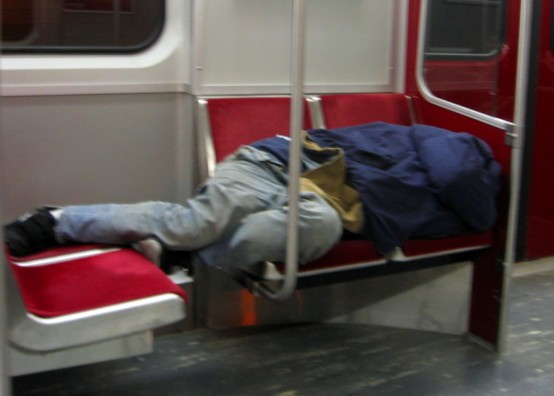
A homeless man sleeps on the TTC subway.

The 1950s and 1960s also saw an international movement towards deinstitutionalization of the mentally ill, moving them out of asylums and other facilities, and releasing them into the community. Studies found that the vast majority of those who had been placed in asylums could be healthy and productive members of society if placed in the community and provided with the proper care and medication.

Thus over these decades the number of people confined to mental institutions fell dramatically from just under 70,000 to about 20,000. However, while great savings were made by shutting down empty institutions much of this money was absorbed by general government funds, and did not make it into community care.

No assurances were made that those discharged had access to and were taking the medication they needed. While some of those discharged did integrate with the community, a significant number, estimated at 75%, did not. Many of these individuals became homeless. Today up to 40% of homeless have some sort of mental illness.

=== Justice system and homelessness ===
In a paper published in 2010, York University professor, Stephen Gaetz, argued that, "[p]risoners who are sentenced or who are awaiting trial often lose their jobs and housing, and without support, wind up in homeless shelters and drop-ins upon release ... When prisoners become homeless, their chances of reoffending increase."

In 2005 Alberta initiated a three-year program offering an "alternative to sending people to jail or helping them when they are released". Alberta's Pathways to Housing program, which includes about $7 million in provincial money, has been helping homeless Calgarians who have been in and out of the corrections system due to unpaid tickets for petty crimes.

=== Poverty in Canada ===
Poverty remains prevalent with certain groups in Canada. The measurement of poverty has been a challenge as there is no official government measure. Some groups, like the Canadian Council on Social Development and the National Anti-Poverty Organization, believe the low-income cut off published by Statistics Canada is applicable as a poverty measure regardless of whether its intent or designation is to be one. They have argued, that as it stands, the LICO is the best measure available that accurately measures a relative poverty rate. The LICO fell to a near-record low of 9.5% in 2006, down from a recent high of 16.7% in 1994.

In the 2005 census, 702,650 Canadians were considered to be at-risk for homelessness in that they spent more than 50 percent of their household income on shelter. Lack of income security combined with the lack of affordable housing creates the problem of "hidden homelessness". The "hidden homeless" may actually fall back and forth between homelessness and being housed, making the problem of homelessness much larger than that identified in street or shelter counts. Homelessness is a big problem in major Canadian cities due to the number of people and the cost of housing in cities.

=== Cuts to Social Assistance (welfare) ===
In the late 1990s, under Finance Minister Paul Martin, large cuts were made to transfer payments to Canada's provinces. At the same time, Canada removed a long-standing requirement of each province and territory to provide a livable rate of social assistance to all those in need. This led to a series of cuts to welfare rates and tightened eligibility rules, with many provinces competing with each other to offer the lowest assistance so those in need would leave. Alberta even offered bus tickets for welfare recipients to leave the province. In 2002, B.C.'s newly elected Liberal government introduced welfare reforms which in the coming years removed tens of thousands from that province's welfare rolls. All of this has had the effect of leaving thousands of people without the means to pay for even the most modest accommodation, resulting in many Canadians having no home and thus relying on homeless shelters or else sleeping outside.

=== Indigenous living conditions ===
People of Indigenous background experience disproportionate levels of unstable housing and homelessness, with 1 in 15 Indigenous persons in urban centres experiencing homelessness, compared to 1 in 128 for the general population. First Nation women have the lowest income rate of any group in Canada, and experience the highest rate of violent assaults. They also have a lack of mobility, due in part to reserve laws, and inability to own property.

Indigenous youth are overrepresented in the homeless population of Canada. Systematic discrimination has contributed to this as well as their overrepresentation in child welfare systems. When Europeans colonized Canada, indigenous peoples experienced an alienation from traditional forms of subsistence that occurred. There was also a loss of culture when the colonizing populations took over indigenous land and subjected them to European ways of life. One way this loss of culture can be seen is through residential schools. Survivors of residential schools faced physical, sexual, and emotional trauma. The European settlers used these schools as a tool to assimilate indigenous youth, which has resulted in decades of trauma that can still be seen in indigenous communities today.

Some researchers, and Indigenous Activists, argue that people living on reserve housing should be considered partly homeless, due to poor living conditions. Since Canada's definition of homelessness includes unsuitable, unstable, or unaffordable housing, reserve housing can be classified under this.

== Public policy ==
The National Homeless Initiative (NHI), created in 1999, was the federal secretariat most directly responsible for homelessness matters until its closure in 2007. The NHI was created to fund transitional housing and a range of services for homeless people across the country. NHI funded the federal program Supporting Community Partnerships Initiative (SCPI) which covered the costs of temporary shelters and services for the homeless.

The federal government replaced the NHI with the Homelessness Partnering Strategy (HPS) which was allocated to spend $270 million between 2007 and 2009. In September 2008, the Government of Canada announced that it would set aside funding for housing and homelessness programs of $387.9 million per year for the next five years.

Canada was criticized in 2009 by the United Nations for lacking a national housing strategy (lacking citations). At that point, the federal governments' expenditures were cost-sharing, one-time only funding initiatives that lack long-term leadership on homelessness. The United Nations has also noted the lack of information on these expenditures, including the number of houses produced.

In 2017, the federal government began a 10-year National Housing Strategy which has up to now committed over $72 billion to initiatives such as combatting homelessness and expanding housing supply.

Housing has been declared a fundamental human right. Canada helped to draft the 1948 UN Declaration of Human Rights that includes a right to access housing in Article 25. Canada also ratified the International Covenant on Economic, Social, and Cultural Rights in 1976, which recognizes an adequate standard of living, including housing, in Article 11.

Homeless advocates maintain that government funding should be spent on securing affordable housing versus funding more homelessness programs.

== Alberta ==
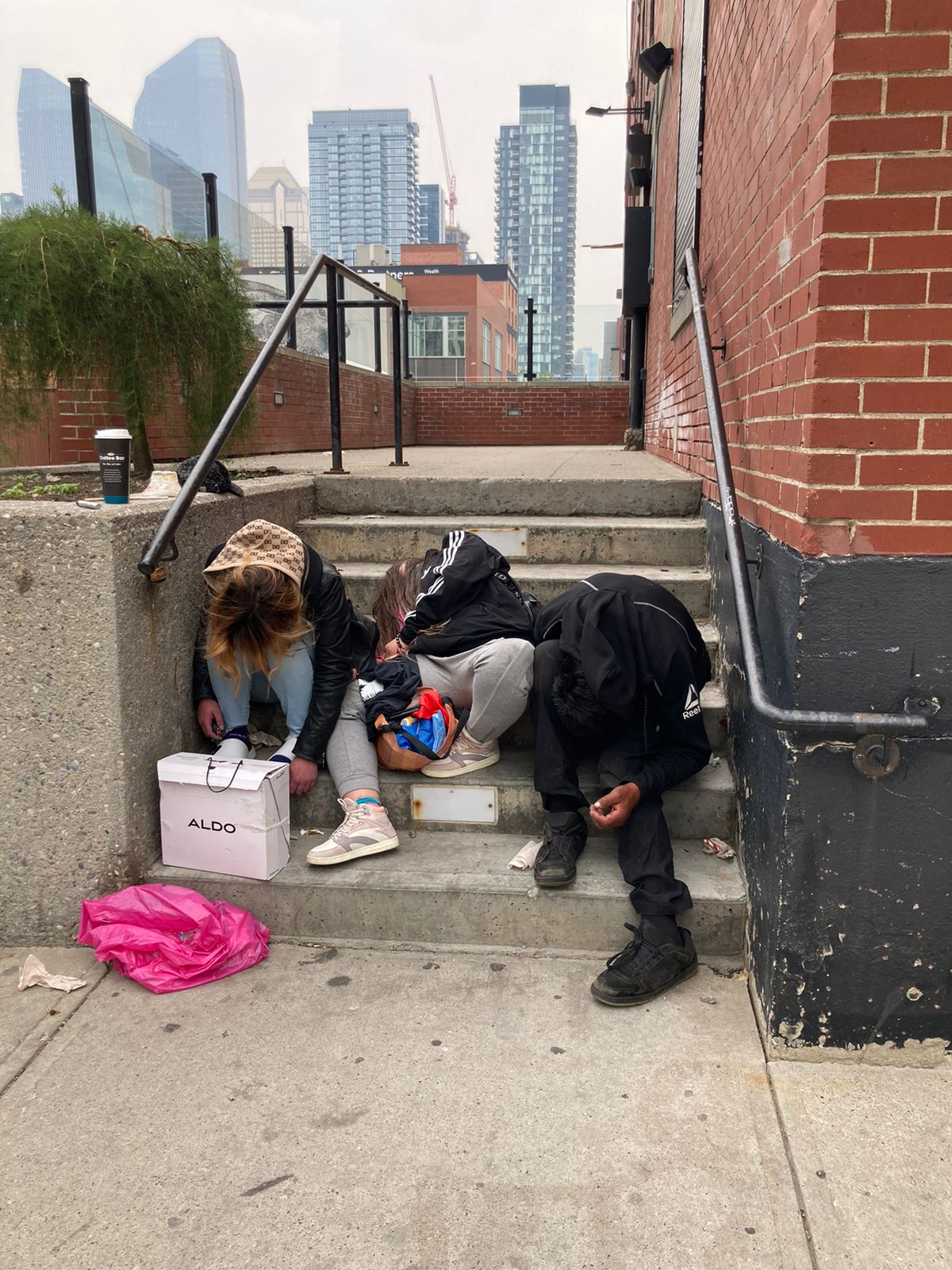
Group of homeless people in Calgary, Canada, 2023

In 2008, the Alberta Secretariat for Action on Homelessness's Plan for Alberta, adopted a goal of ending homelessness in Alberta by 2019 with a focus on three key areas: rapid re-housing of homeless Albertans, providing client-centered supports to re-housed clients, and preventing homelessness. Pathways to Housing Canada uses the Housing First model, a "client-driven strategy that provides immediate access to an apartment without requiring initial participation in psychiatric treatment or treatment for sobriety."

Clients pay 30 percent of their income towards their rent: 85 percent of Pathways to Housing clients receive Assured Income for the Severely Handicapped (AISH) benefits and 15 percent receive

In 2007 Calgary's Pathways to Housing campaign included the opening of the Alex By 2013 Calgary's Pathways to Housing had 150 individuals in scatter site homes. The Alex Pathways to Housing uses the Housing First model, but it also uses Assertive Community Treatment (ACT), an integrated approach to healthcare where clients access a team of "nurses, mental health specialists, justice specialists and substance abuse specialists." Director Sue Fortune is committed to the 10 Year Plan To End Homelessless in the Calgary Region. Fortune reported that the Housing First approach resulted in a 66 percent decline in days hospitalized (from one year prior to intake compared to one year in the program), a 38 percent decline in times in emergency room, a 41 percent decline in EMS events, a 79 percent decline in days in jail and a 30 percent decline in police interactions.

As of September 2022, Calgary reported a total of 2,782 individuals experiencing homelessness, representing a 4% decrease compared to 2018.

As of October 2024, Calgary recorded 6,701 service requests through 311 regarding homeless encampments, marking a 24% increase compared to the first nine months of 2023 and nearly seven times the number reported in 2018. Additionally, an underground tunnel encampment was discovered during the same year.

== British Columbia ==
In 2001, in British Columbia the service and shelter costs of homeless people ranged from $30,000 to $40,000 annually versus $22,000 to $28,000 per year for formerly homeless persons housed in social housing.

=== Homelessness in Vancouver ===
In 2011, there were about 2,651 homeless people in Vancouver.

== See also ==
- Affordable housing in Canada
- Homelessness in Vancouver
- Housing First
- Le Bon Dieu Dans La Rue (Dans La Rue)
- Old Brewery Mission
- Poverty in Canada
- Seaton House
- Union Gospel Mission
