= Chief Nursing Officer (Canada) =

Most senior government advisor on nursing matters

Chief Nursing Officer of Canada
- L’infirmier en chef
- Incumbent; Leigh Chapman since 23 August 2022
- Health Canada
- Abbreviation: CNO
- Reports to: Assistant Deputy Minister of Health
- Term length: 2 years
- Inaugural holder: Verna Huffman Splane
- Formation: 1968

The Chief Nursing Officer (CNO) is the most senior advisor on nursing matters in the Canadian government. The office is associated with the Department of Health's Strategic Policy Branch.

== Role ==
The CNO position has been credited with creating nurse educator positions in hospitals, targeting federal funding for research on nursing working conditions, and enabling access to federal databases to research healthcare findings.

Since its restoration in 2022, the role has included advising on health workforce planning, long-term care, home care, palliative care, mental health, substance use, and models of care. The CNO also engages with provincial and territorial governments, nursing organizations, regulators, educators, and members of the public.

== History ==
In 1968, the inaugural Chief Nursing Officer (CNO) was appointed in Canada. The first CNO was Verna Huffman Splane. Sources differ on the length of her tenure, with some indicating that she served until 1972 and others suggesting she continued until the early 1980s. The role's scope was expanded in 1999 with the establishment of the Office of Nursing Policy within Health Canada's Strategic Policy Branch. In 2012, during a realignment of resources, the CNO position at Health Canada was eliminated by the Harper administration. The position was vacant for about ten years until it was restored in 2022 by the Trudeau administration and filled for the first time in a decade.

== Officeholders ==
Name	Term start	Term end	Notes
Verna Huffman Splane	1968	1972 or early 1980s	First Chief Nursing Officer of Canada
Leigh Chapman	23 August 2022	present	First CNO in ten years, appointed by the Trudeau administration
