= Reach Out Response Network =

Toronto advocacy organization

- Formation: 2020
- Headquarters: Toronto
- Co-founders: Asante Haughton, Rachel Bromberg
- Website: https://reachouttoronto.ca/

Reach Out Response Network is a Toronto based organization that advocates for the City of Toronto to increase community-led responses to mental health emergencies.

== Organization ==
Reach Out Response Network is a community-led Toronto-based organization that was founded by Rachel Bromberg and Asante Haughton in 2020. It was based on the Crisis Assistance Helping Out On The Streets program run by the Eugene Police Department with a strong focus on advocacy work.

== Activities ==
In July 2020, co-founders Haughton and Bromberg published an op-ed in the Toronto Star promoting the organization. This created an influx of volunteers and a connection to Mohamed Shuriye, the City of Toronto's new manager of policing reform.

In 2020, they submitted a 92-page report of recommendations to the City of Toronto.

Their 2021 publication Report on International Crisis Response Team Training documented alternatives to police response to mental-health-related emergencies. Later in 2021, the group welcomed the City of Toronto's decision to pilot community-led responses to 911 calls about mental health crises.

== See also ==
- Doctors for Defunding the Police
