= Lise Watier =

Canadian prestige cosmetic company brand

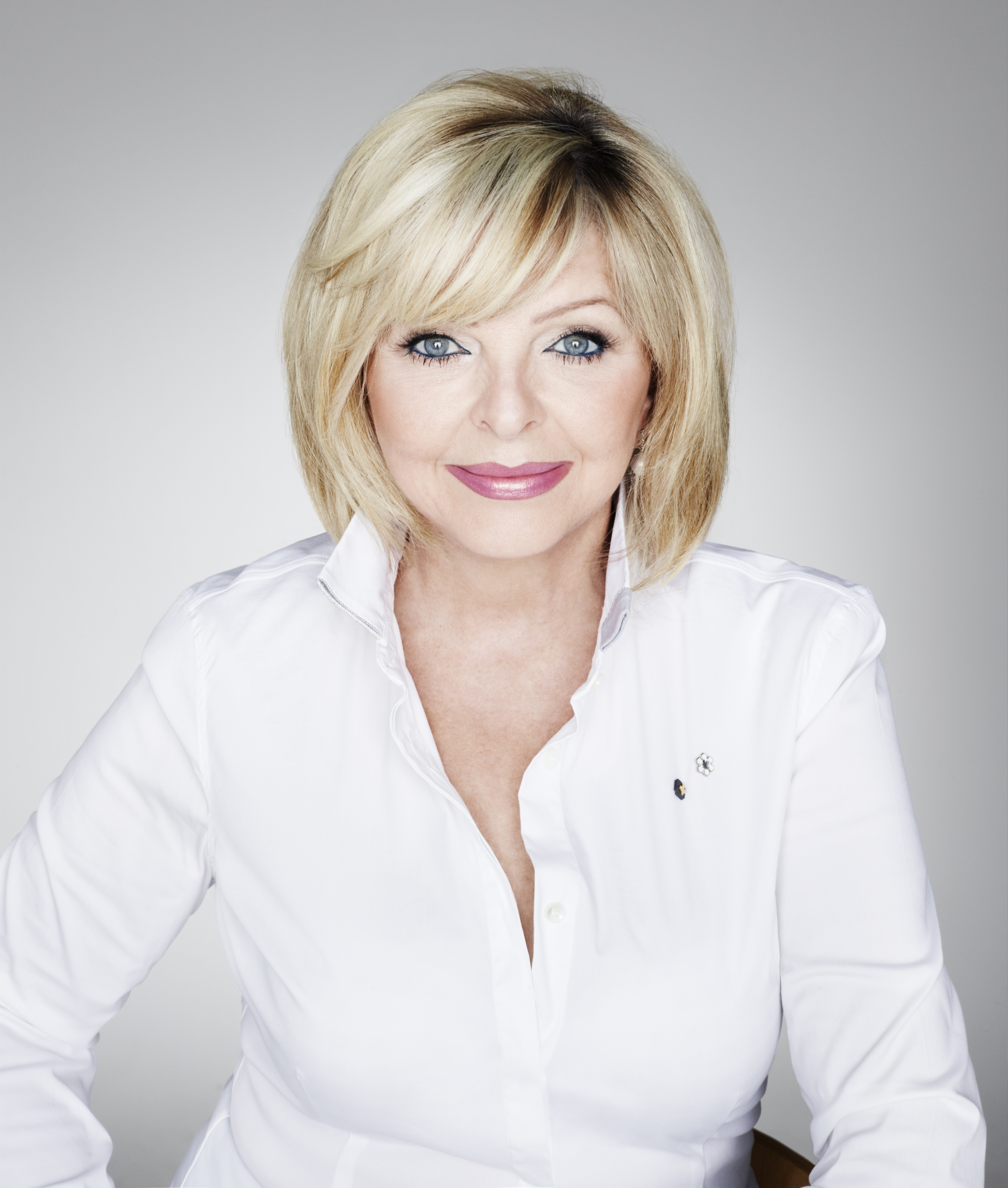
- Madame Lise Watier
- Type: Subsidiary of Groupe Marcelle Inc.
- Industry: Cosmetics
- Founded: 1972
- Headquarters: Montreal, Canada
- Products: Makeup, skin care and fragrances
- Website: www.watier.com/en/

Lise Watier is a Canadian prestige cosmetic company and brand, launched in 1972 by Madame Lise Watier, OC, and distributed through department and select drugstores.

== History ==
Lise Watier was born in Montreal in 1942. Her father worked his way up to become manager of a car dealership and her mother had a sense of fashion.

She told the Toronto Star that the heavy makeup she wore for her job as a researcher and host for a women's interest television program from 1963 to 1968 inspired her to create a self-improvement and makeup course company, Charme et Beauté Lise Watier Inc., in 1965, and to launch her own line of cosmetics in 1972.

The Montreal-based company first attempted to expand in the 1980s, but a fire in the company's factory and offices was a major setback. Watier later told the National Post, "It took until 1995 to get back to the point we were at in 1990." By the turn of the century, the company's cosmetics were distributed in France and across Canada.

Watier was a family-owned company; Watier's husband, Serge Rocheleau was chairman and general manager, and daughters Nathalie and Marie-Lise worked in marketing.

The brand is distributed in Canada and the United States.

In 1986, the company's founder was honoured as Canadian business woman of the year.

In 2007, Imperial Capital Corporation of Toronto, an investment firm, purchased a majority stake in the company, with Watier and Rocheleau retaining seats on the board and a minority share in the company.

In 2009, the company signed Mitsou Gélinas, a Canadian singer, actor and television personality, as ambassador.

In 2013, Watier stepped down as CEO, appointing Pierre Plasard, previously of L'Oréal, to take her place. As of that time, the company had 175 employees and did approximately $90 million in sales annually.

The company was acquired by Groupe Marcelle Inc. in 2016.
