= Ritika Goel =

Canadian doctor and activist

- Born: India
- Occupation: Medical doctor
- Organization(s): University of Toronto; Inner City Health Associates

Ritika Goel is a Toronto-based Canadian writer, activist, professor, and family doctor known for public advocacy on social justice matters.

== Early life ==
Goel was born in India before emigrating to Canada.

== Career and advocacy ==
Goel is a family doctor who works for Inner City Health Associates and a member of the Decent Work and Health Network known for her advocacy around tax reform, and her encouragement of doctors to express solidarity with Palestinians. She is a professor at the University of Toronto's Department of Family and Community Medicine where she was named as the first faculty lead for social accountability.

== Selected publications ==
As a sole author:

- Trudeau's Brownface Is a Symptom of a Much More Dangerous Disease, 2019, The Tyee

Co-authored:

- Gary Block and Ritika Goel, A Multi-level Approach to Treating Social Risk to Health for Health Providers - Chapter 3 of: Tackling Causes and Consequences of Health Inequalities by James Matheson, John Patterson, Laura Neilson, CRC Press, 2020 ISBN 9781351013895
- Goel et al., Implementation and impact of an online tool used in primary care to improve access to financial benefits for patients: a study protocol The BMJ 2017;7:e015947
