= Naheed Dosani =

Canadian palliative care physician

Naheed Dosani MSC
- Education: University of Ontario Institute of Technology; McMaster University; University of Toronto
- Organization(s): Palliative Education and Care for the Homeless; Doctors for Defunding the Police

Naheed Dosani is a palliative care physician based in Ontario, Canada, who founded and leads the Palliative Education and Care for the Homeless (PEACH) program. For his efforts in providing mobile healthcare to individuals with vulnerable housing or are homeless, Dosani has received a Meritorious Service Cross (Civil Division) from the Governor General of Canada (2017), and a Canadian Medical Association Award for Young Leaders (2020).

== Early life and education ==
Dosani is the son of two Indian refugee parents, who came to Canada from Uganda in the 1970s, fleeing persecution and war.

In 2008, Dosani completed a Bachelor of Science degree in the Biological and Biomedical Sciences program at the University of Ontario Institute of Technology (now Ontario Tech University). He studied medicine at the Michael G. DeGroote School of Medicine at McMaster University, and completed a family medicine residency at St. Michael's Hospital, at the University of Toronto. During his residency, Dosani provided medical care to a man experiencing homelessness at a Toronto shelter who was dying of head and neck cancer and also had schizophrenia and a substance use disorder. This experience motivated Dosani to pursue training in palliative care during his final year of residency, and launch the Palliative Education and Care for the Homeless (PEACH) program.

== Career ==
In July 2014, Dosani founded and continues to serve as the lead physician the Palliative Education and Care for the Homeless (PEACH) program to provide mobile community-based hospice palliative care to vulnerable individuals living in shelters, rooming houses or on the streets. PEACH is a 24/7 program, supported by four palliative care physicians, a home care coordinator, and a community care team. The PEACH program leads various efforts. The team created 'Grief Circles' to support the team's needs to grieve as a community in a safe space. The PEACH Good Wishes program (supported by donations) has granted about 40 wishes to individuals who are homeless and facing life-limiting illness. Dosani played a critical role in setting up the Journey Home Hospice, an end-of-life centre for people who are homeless in Toronto. PEACH is supported through provincial healthcare funding and philanthropic funding, and has inspired similar models in various jurisdictions, including Edmonton, Toronto (Journey Home Hospice), Calgary, and Seattle.

Dosani is an Assistant Clinical Professor in Family Medicine at McMaster University's Faculty of Health Sciences, and a lecturer in the Division of Palliative Care at the University of Toronto's Department of Family and Community Medicine.

During the COVID-19 pandemic, Dosani has been serving as the medical director of the Region Of Peel's isolation housing system, which was set up in partnership with community organizations. He has also used social media platforms, including Twitter, Instagram and TikTok, to share credible medical information and advocate for people whose health is affected by social factors. He has spoken about different aspects of medicine and the COVID-19 pandemic for multiple media outlets about various topics, including medical assistance in dying, unique COVID-19 challenges for individuals who are homeless, people affected by the social determinants of health and public health practices.

Dosani's efforts have been recognized by a College of Family Physicians of Canada's Early Career Development Award (2015), a Meritorious Service Cross (Civil Division) from the Governor General of Canada (2017), a humanitarian award from the Canadian Society of Palliative Care Physicians (2019), a Canadian Medical Association Award for Young Leaders (Early Career, 2020), a University of Toronto Faculty of Medicine Dean's Alumni Humanitarian Award (2020). He created the Dr. Naheed Dosani Entrance Scholarship, which is awarded annually to a University of Ontario Institute of Technology (UOIT) student who demonstrates the impact of involvement and growth through humanitarian action.

== Selected academic publications ==
- Minding the gap: access to palliative care and the homeless. Lise Huynh, Blair Henry and Naheed Dosani. BMC Palliative Care. Volume 14, Article number: 62 (2015).
- COVID-19 and people experiencing homelessness: challenges and mitigation strategies. Melissa Perri, Naheed Dosani and Stephen W. Hwang. Canadian Medical Association Journal. June 29, 2020 192 (26) E716-E719.
- Influenza Vaccination Rates Among Homeless Adults With Mental Illness in Toronto. Samantha Young, Naheed Dosani, Adam Whisler, Stephen Hwang. Journal of Primary Care & Community Health. 2014.
- Perceptions of palliative care in a South Asian community: findings from an observational study. Naheed Dosani, Ravi Bhargava, Amit Arya, Celeste Pang, Pavinder Tut, Achal Sharma & Martin Chasen. BMC Palliative Care. Volume 19, Article number: 141 (2020).
