= Verna Huffman Splane =

Chief nursing officer in Canada

Verna Huffman Splane OC

1st Chief Nursing Officer of Canada
- In office 1968–1972
- Prime Minister: Pierre Trudeau

Personal details
- Born: Verna Marie Huffman; November 23, 1914 Peterborough, Ontario, Canada
- Died: January 10, 2015 (aged 100) Vancouver, British Columbia, Canada
- Spouse: Richard Splane (m. 1971)
- Education: University of Toronto; Columbia University (BSc); University of Michigan (MPH)
- Occupation: Registered nurse

Verna Huffman Splane OC (November 23, 1914 – January 10, 2015) was a Canadian registered nurse. She served as the first Chief Nursing Officer of Canada from 1968 until 1972.

== Early life and education ==
Splane was born on November 23, 1914, in Peterborough, Ontario, Canada. She received a diploma in Public Health diploma from the University of Toronto in 1939, a Bachelor of Science in Nursing degree from Columbia University in 1957, and a Master of Public Health degree from the University of Michigan.

== Nursing career ==
Before pursuing her undergraduate degree in nursing at Columbia University, Splane joined the Victorian Order of Nurses as a registered nurse.

From 1968 until 1972, Splane served as the first Chief Nursing Officer of Canada. She also served as vice-president of the International Council of Nurses for two terms. Splane also served as vice president of the International Social Service.
