= Hidden homeless =

Homeless people missed by censuses of the homeless population

The hidden homeless are people who lack stable and permanent housing but are not visibly residing outdoors or in homeless shelters, and who often go uncounted in official measures of homelessness. Those experiencing hidden homelessness appear to have housing and often intentionally conceal their homeless status to avoid intervention by authorities such as child protective services. Couch surfing, sleeping in cars or RVs, living in temporary housing like motels, and "doubling up" multiple families in a single-family residence are common types of hidden homelessness. In the United States, surveys taken by public schools reveal much higher numbers of hidden homeless children compared with official counts of those visibly homeless.

== United States ==
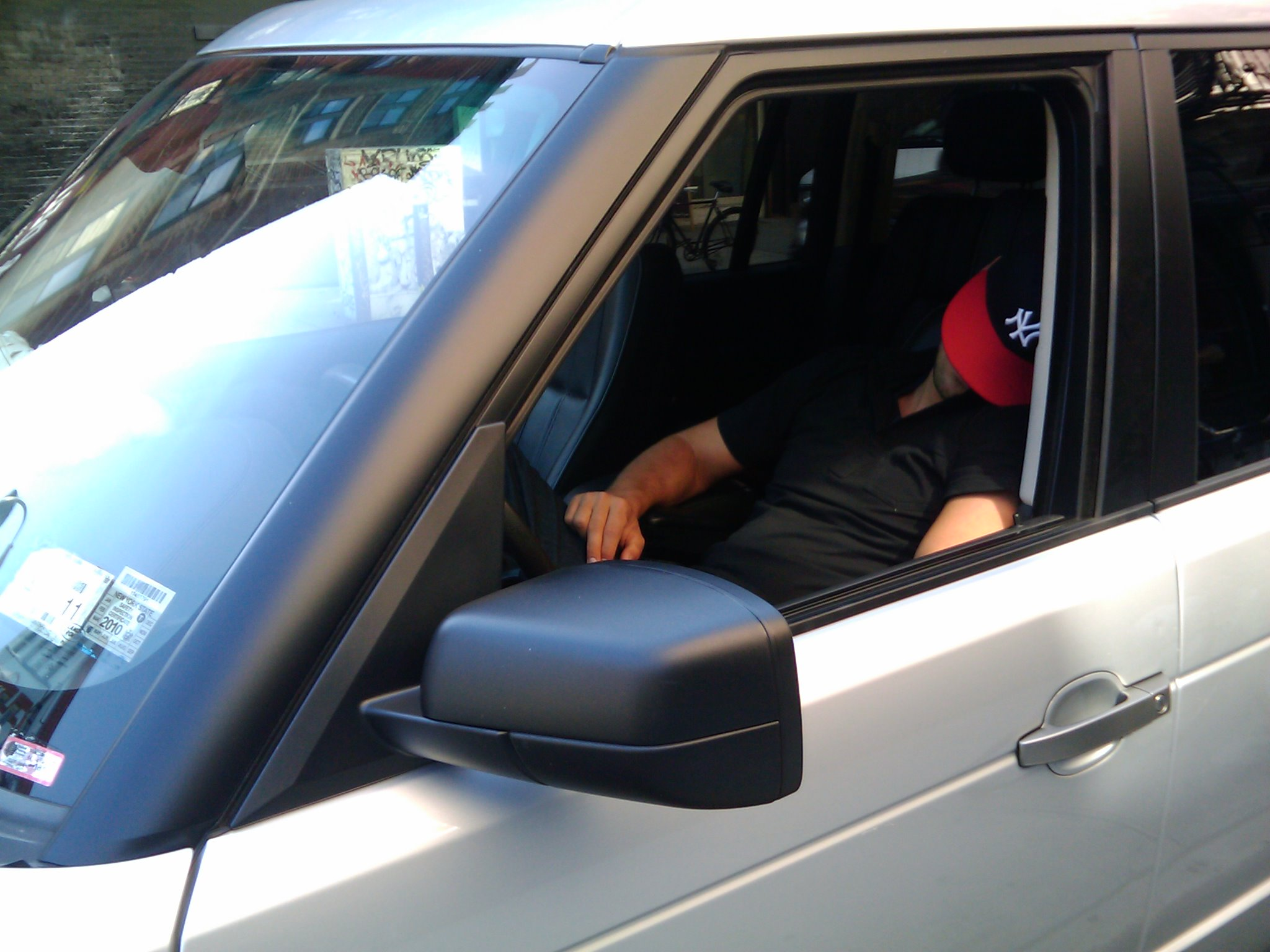
People who have no regular place to sleep but their cars are experiencing one type of hidden homelessness

In 2022, the US Department of Housing and Urban Development used its annual "point in time" count of people living in shelters and public spaces to estimate that 582,462 people were visibly experiencing homelessness in the United States. But in 2021, US public schools counted 1.1 million students as homeless (most of them living in motels or sleeping on couches), with 76% of them “doubled up” with other families.

=== California and Monterey County ===
A 2024 California survey revealed 20,000 students (4% of the statewide population) lacked a "fixed, regular, and adequate night-time residence" which is the definition used in the federal McKinney-Vento Education for Homeless Children and Youth Program. In Monterey county (where 16% of children were surveyed as homeless), 90% of them lived "doubled up": several families in a house, apartment, or a garage.

Advocates for those experiencing hidden homelessness say parents try to keep their status hidden for fear that authorities and child welfare agencies will intervene.

In 2023, a Monterey grower was fined for converting a greenhouse to make 62 makeshift dwellings where nearly 100 people lived, in violation of safety and building codes. Multiple government agencies, including child protective services, were involved in relocating the residents.

== United Kingdom ==
According to OECD data, one in 200 households in the United Kingdom were homeless, with 80% of them living in a temporary accommodation. In 2024, Shelter, a UK housing charity, estimated that 145,800 children in England had no fixed residence.

== See also ==
- Housing insecurity
- Homelessness in the US
- Homelessness in the United Kingdom
