= Leslie Shanks =

Canadian medical doctor

- Citizenship: Canadian
- Education: Queen's University
- Known for: Humanitarian health work

Leslie Shanks is a Canadian medical doctor who served as the president of Médecins Sans Frontières Canada, the medical director of MSF Netherlands, and who led humanitarian responses in Yugoslavia, Zaire and Sudan.

== Education ==
Shanks graduated from Queen's University in 1988.

== Career ==
=== Employment ===
Shanks career started with work in northern parts of Canada providing healthcare to Indigenous communities.

She joined Médecins Sans Frontières (MSF) in 1994 and was sent to Yugoslavia to lead humanitarian health responses the Bosnia War. She subsequently led MSF's response in Zaire (now Democratic Republic of the Congo) supporting refugees fleeing the Rwandan genocide, later managing a tuberculosis program in Sudan. After her field work, she became the medical director of MSF's Operational Centre in Amsterdam where she was part of a group that shifted MSF towards open sharing of medical data. She is currently the medical advisor to the OCA council of the MSF Operational Center Amsterdam and temporary member of the International Board of MSF, https://www.msf.org/international-board

She has worked as the medical director at both the Sherbourne Health Centre in Toronto providing care to trans patients, and also at Inner City Health Associates, the Toronto organization that provides care to people experiencing homelessness.

She is one of the co-founders of Wanasah, a not-for-profit mental health association in Toronto.

=== Advocacy ===
Shanks been critical of the United States military, specifically their role in the Kunduz hospital airstrike, and has participated in public awareness campaigns highlighting the plight of refugees.

== Selected publications ==
- Shanks, Leslie (2013). "To err is humanitarian". BMJ.
- Shanks, L; Klarkowski, D; O'Brien, DP (2013). "False positive HIV diagnoses in resource limited settings: operational lessons learned for HIV programmes". PLOS ONE. 8 (3) e59906. Bibcode:2013PLoSO...859906S. doi:10.1371/journal.pone.0059906. PMC 3603939. PMID 23527284.
- Shanks, L; Ariti, C; Siddiqui, MR; Pintaldi, G; Venis, S; de Jong, K; Denault, M (2013). "Counselling in humanitarian settings: a retrospective analysis of 18 individual-focused non-specialised counselling programmes". Confl Health. 7 (1) 19. doi:10.1186/1752-1505-7-19. PMC 3849884. PMID 24041036.
- Shanks, Leslie; Schull, Michael J. (2000). "Rape in war: the humanitarian response". Canadian Medical Association Journal. 163 (9): 1152–1156. PMC 80250. PMID 11079062.
- De Lange, Rink, et al. "Keeping It Simple: A Gender-Specific Sanitation Tool for Emergencies." Waterlines, vol. 33, no. 1, Practical Action Publishing, 2014, pp. 45–54, JSTOR 24687555.
