= Lise Watier (businesswoman) =

Canadian businesswoman

Order of Canada Lise Watier
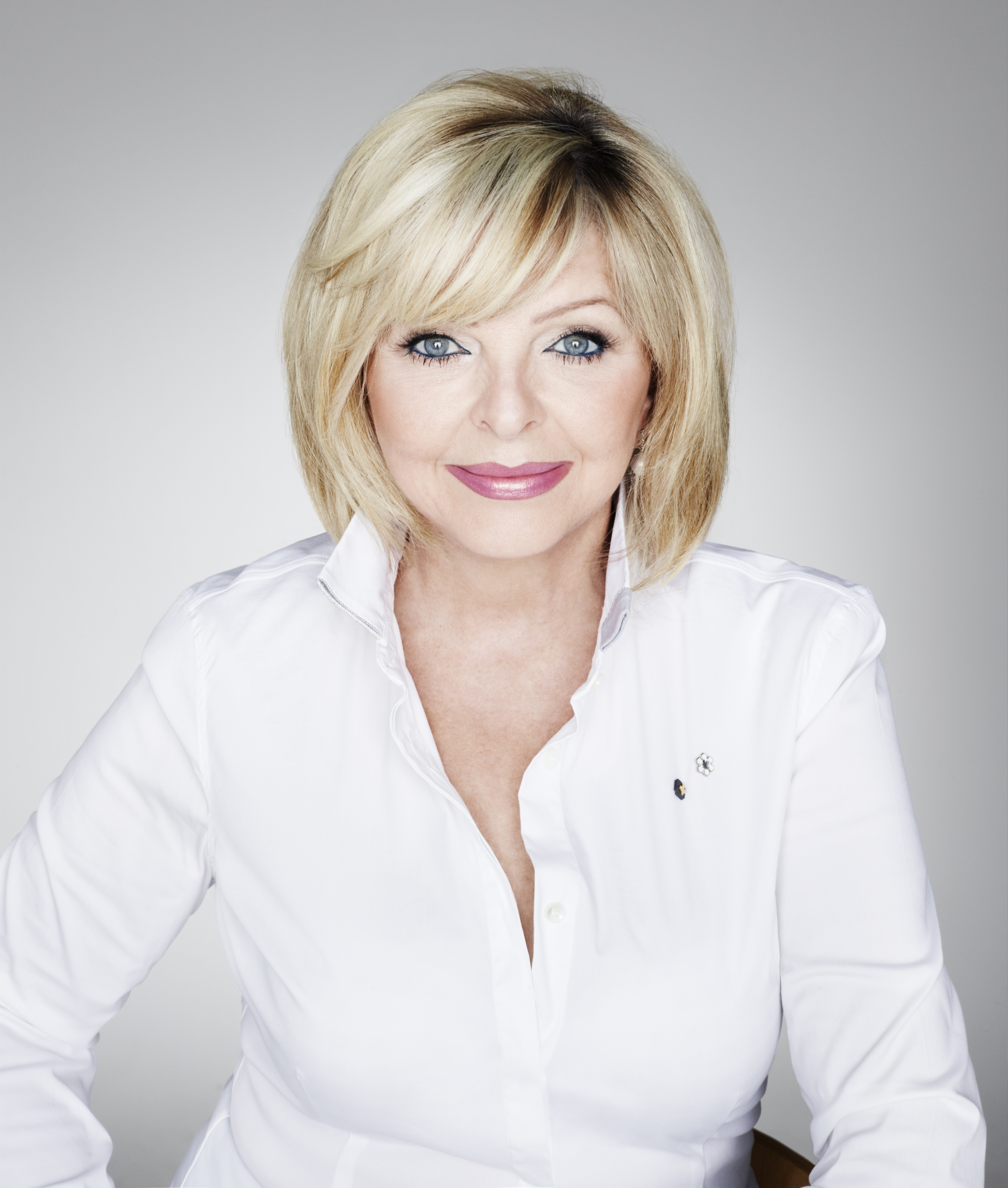
- Born: Marie Ginette Jeanne Lise Watier; 8 November 1942 (age 83); Montreal, Quebec, Canada
- Known for: Businesswoman
- Awards: Officer of the National Order of Quebec (2000); Grand Officer of the National Order of Quebec (2014)
- Honours: Member of the Order of Canada

Lise Watier (born on 8 November 1942) is a Canadian businesswoman. She is the founder of the cosmetics company Lise Watier, which she headed from 1972 to 2013. In 1999, Ottawa Citizen journalist Kate Jaimer nicknamed her "the Celine Dion of Quebec makeup".

== Biography ==
Watier was the only child in a family where she was the center of attention. Outside the family unit, she was described as shy during her years at the convent. As a teenager, she lacked self-confidence due to her appearance, which she considered thin and gave herself the nickname of shallot. Noticing her insecurities, her mother encouraged her to take a makeup course at the Salonde Regina de France on Sainte Catherine Street. It was also at this time that she discovered a passion for makeup.

=== Personal life ===
Lise Watier has been married to Serge Rocheleau since 1988. She has two children (daughters), Nathalie and Marie-Lise, from a previous relationship with Guillermo Andrade. Family members worked for Watier's company; her husband was the CEO, and her two daughters were employees.

The Lise Watier archive collection (P1001) is kept at the BAnQ center in Old Montreal from the National Library and Archives of Quebec.

== Professional career ==
Before heading a cosmetics company, she started in television as a researcher and host of a show aimed at women in the 1960s. In 1965, she created Charme et Beauté Lise Watier Inc., a company specializing in personal development and makeup. In 1972, she launched her own cosmetics line, Lise Watier Inc.

The Montreal-based company began expansion attempts in the 1980s until a fire damaged the factory and offices. "It was not until 1995 that the status was equal to that achieved in 1990," Lise Watier told the National Post.

In 2007, Imperial Capital Corporation of Toronto became part owner of the company, and Watier and Rocheleau become minority shareholders in the management of the company. In 2013, she retired from the position of president and CEO of her company and made way for Pierre Plasard, formerly CEO of L'Oréal.

When you understand that beauty is an emotion, you know a lot more than any man who wants to start a beauty business. – Lise Watier at the press conference

== Awards and recognitions ==
- 1986 – Veuve Clicquot Prize
- 1987 – Prix Excellence – Journal La Presse
- 1991 – Member of the Order of Canada
- 1992 – One of Canada's ten entrepreneurs of the decade – Profit Magazine (Toronto)
- 1993, 1994, 1995, 1996, 1997, 1998 – Businesswoman of the Year – Léger & Léger Marketing Research
- 2000 – Officer of National Order of Quebec
- 2002 – Management Award – McGill University
- 2010 – Honorary Doctorate from the University of Quebec in Montreal
- 2014 – Doctorate Honoris Causa from HEC Montréal
- 2016 – Medal of Honour from the National Assembly of Quebec
