= Stella's Place =

Toronto youth mental health charity

- Formation: 2013
- Founder: Donna Green
- Headquarters: Toronto
- Executive Director: Nzinga Walker
- Website: https://stellasplace.ca/

Stella’s Place is a Toronto-based young adult mental health center and charity. It is the only youth mental health charity in Toronto that provides services for people aged between 18 and 29 years.

== Organization and activities ==
Stella's Place is a young adult mental health hub located in Toronto that provides clinical services, counselling, mentoring, employment and drop-in support services to about 800 youth annually. It is the only youth mental health charity in Toronto that provides services for people aged between 18 and 29 years.

Therapy provided by the peer-counsellors includes an adapted dialectical behavior therapy program.. The Centre offers educational workshops on mental health topics related to peer support, supervision, dialectical behavior therapy, recovery, facilitative practice, and active listening through its Learning and Educational Department.

The organization was founded in 2013 by Donna Green and moved to a larger location in Toronto's Queen West area in 2020. Green opened the charity after struggling to find support for the mental health needs of her daughter, Stella.

The Centre works in partnership with City of Toronto and is funded by the federal government of Canada.
