= Couch surfing =

Staying a few days before moving on to the next house

A man sleeping on a friend's couch. Couch surfers often have to deal with imperfect accomodations.

Couch surfing is a term that generally indicates the practice of moving from house to house, sleeping in whatever spare space is available (often a couch or floor), generally staying a few days before moving on to another house. People sometimes couch surf when they are travelling or because they are homeless.

== Couch surfing in travel ==
Couch surfing's cultural significance grew when the website CouchSurfing was launched in 2004. Upon the release of the app, what previously used to be a cheap alternative for budget travelers became recognized as a hip, new way to travel. Couch surfing became not only a way to save money, but a way to meet new people and have new experiences. Its attraction was in the way it allowed people to have a more immersive and authentic travel experience. Besides CouchSurfing, many other platforms were created and groups were formed in order to help people who are looking to couch surf connect with potential hosts and other travelers. While couch surfing may not be considered the most popular or mainstream way to travel, in 2018 around 15 million people had identified using couch surfing accommodations to travel. However, couch surfing comes with the issue of safety. It can be less regulated than traditional forms of travel accommodations, making it a more risky choice for vulnerable travelers.

== Couch surfing as homelessness ==
Couch surfing is also considered a form of homelessness. It is the most common type of homelessness amongst youth. It can be a result of substance abuse, conflict in home relationships, or aftermath of leaving abusive situations. The individual may turn to couch surfing as a temporary solution, staying with friends or family members while they search for permanent housing or a way to get back on their feet. It is different from sleeping on the streets or in a shelter, but it still has significant challenges, including the lack of stability and the strain on an individual. Couch surfing homelessness can be a short-term solution to homelessness, but it is not a sustainable solution in the long term. Individuals experiencing couch surfing homelessness often face uncertainty and instability, which can lead to negative consequences such as difficulty in finding employment, social isolation, and mental health issues.

Couch surfing is usually missed by homeless counts and is therefore a type of hidden homelessness. For example, in 2017, HUD counted 114 thousand children as homeless in the United States in their homeless count, while surveys conducted by the Department of Education concluded there were 1.3 million. Couch surfing is especially common among those under the age of 25, including children. In Britain, 1 in 5 young people have couch surfed at least once each year, and almost half of those have done so for more than a month.

While safer than sleeping in the rough, couch surfing is not an adequate long term housing solution. Most couch surfers only stay in a single home for a short period of time. This may be because their host limits their stay, they voluntarily leave to preserve friendships, or they are forced to leave the home of a person who is abusive or has a drug problem. Some couch surfers have received housing in exchange for services such as cooking and cleaning. In other cases, people will have otherwise unwanted sexual encounters to be able to couch surf at a person's home for the night. Those who couch surf often sleep in the rough after leaving their accommodations.

== See also ==
- Divorce
- Hostel
- Housing First
- Internally displaced person
- Right to housing
