= National Alliance to End Homelessness =

Organization

- Founded: 1983
- Purpose: Preventing and ending homelessness in the United States.
- Location: Washington, D.C.
- CEO: Ann Oliva
- Website: www.endhomelessness.org

The National Alliance to End Homelessness is a United States–based organization addressing the issue of homelessness. The Alliance provides data and research to policymakers and elected officials in order to inform policy debates. They also work on the local level to provide community partners with information on best practices and technical assistance.

== History ==
In 1983, the National Citizens Committee for Food and Shelter was established to meet the emergency needs of the homeless population. In 1987, the Committee determined that a more comprehensive approach was necessary and created the National Alliance to End Homelessness. In May 2022, Ann Oliva was named the new president and CEO of the organization, taking over for the previous CEO, Nan Ronan.

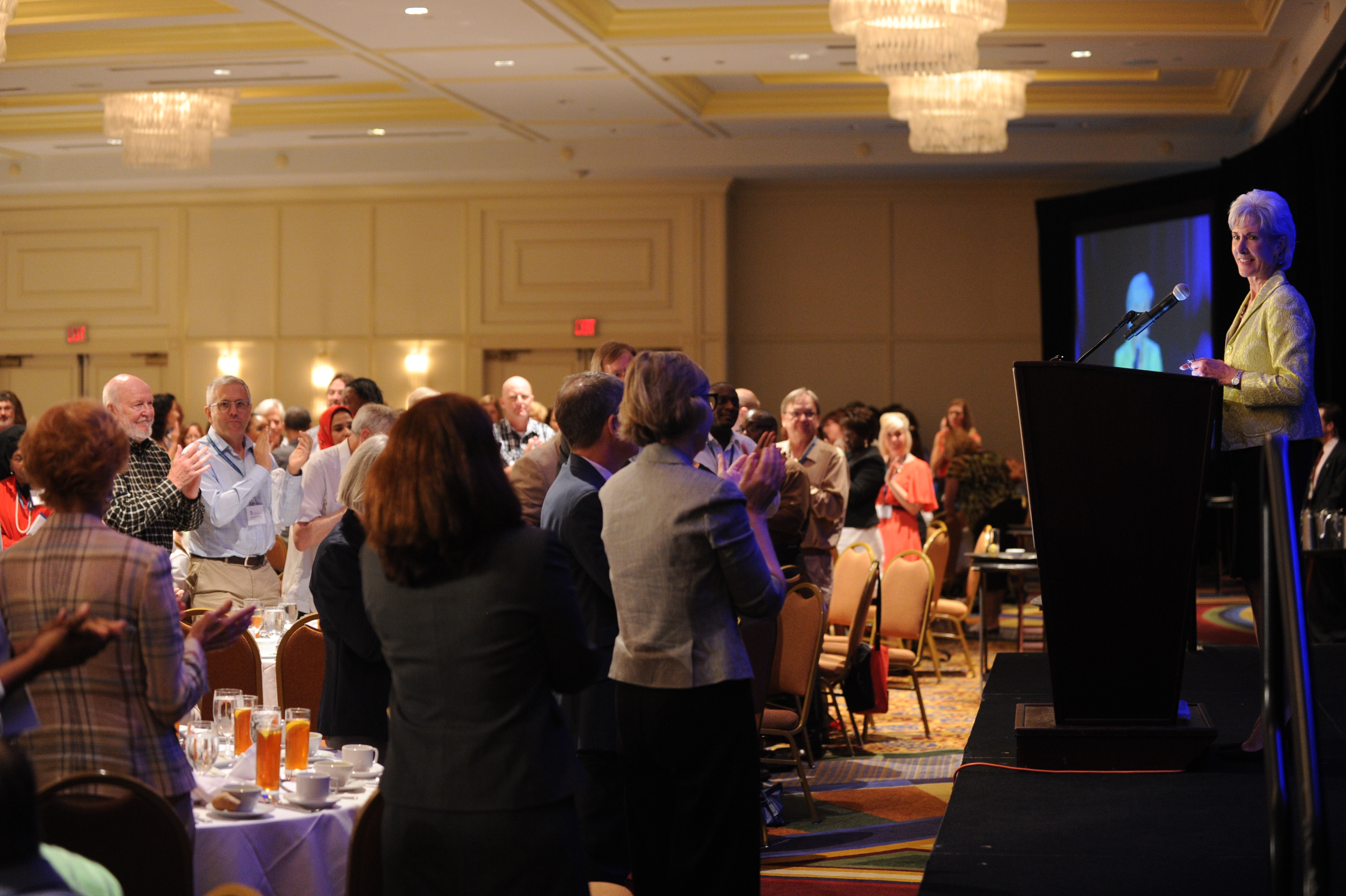
Health & Human Services Secretary Sebelius speaks at the National Alliance to End Homelessness.
